

1–100 

|-bgcolor=#E9E9E9
| 1 Ceres || 1943 XB ||  || January 1, 1801 || Palermo || G. Piazzi || — || align=right | 939 km || 
|-id=002 bgcolor=#E9E9E9
| 2 Pallas || - ||  || March 28, 1802 || Bremen || H. W. Olbers || PAL || align=right | 545 km || 
|-id=003 bgcolor=#E9E9E9
| 3 Juno || - ||  || September 1, 1804 || Sternwarte Lilienthal || K. Harding || JUN || align=right | 247 km || 
|-id=004 bgcolor=#fefefe
| 4 Vesta || - ||  || March 29, 1807 || Bremen || H. W. Olbers || V || align=right | 525 km || 
|-id=005 bgcolor=#E9E9E9
| 5 Astraea || 1969 SE ||  || December 8, 1845 || Driesen || K. L. Hencke || — || align=right | 107 km || 
|-id=006 bgcolor=#fefefe
| 6 Hebe || 1947 JB ||  || July 1, 1847 || Driesen || K. L. Hencke || — || align=right | 185 km || 
|-id=007 bgcolor=#fefefe
| 7 Iris || A847 PA ||  || August 13, 1847 || London || J. R. Hind || — || align=right | 200 km || 
|-id=008 bgcolor=#fefefe
| 8 Flora || A847 UA ||  || October 18, 1847 || London || J. R. Hind || FLO || align=right | 147 km || 
|-id=009 bgcolor=#fefefe
| 9 Metis || A848 HA ||  || April 25, 1848 || Markree || A. Graham || FLO || align=right | 190 km || 
|-id=010 bgcolor=#d6d6d6
| 10 Hygiea || A849 GA ||  || April 12, 1849 || Naples || A. de Gasparis || HYG || align=right | 407 km || 
|-id=011 bgcolor=#fefefe
| 11 Parthenope || A850 JA ||  || May 11, 1850 || Naples || A. de Gasparis || — || align=right | 143 km || 
|-id=012 bgcolor=#fefefe
| 12 Victoria || A850 RA ||  || September 13, 1850 || London || J. R. Hind || KLI || align=right | 115 km || 
|-id=013 bgcolor=#E9E9E9
| 13 Egeria || A850 VA ||  || November 2, 1850 || Naples || A. de Gasparis || — || align=right | 203 km || 
|-id=014 bgcolor=#E9E9E9
| 14 Irene || A851 KA ||  || May 19, 1851 || London || J. R. Hind || — || align=right | 152 km || 
|-id=015 bgcolor=#E9E9E9
| 15 Eunomia || A851 OA ||  || July 29, 1851 || Naples || A. de Gasparis || EUN || align=right | 232 km || 
|-id=016 bgcolor=#d6d6d6
| 16 Psyche || A852 FA ||  || March 17, 1852 || Naples || A. de Gasparis || — || align=right | 226 km || 
|-id=017 bgcolor=#fefefe
| 17 Thetis || A852 HA ||  || April 17, 1852 || Düsseldorf || R. Luther || — || align=right | 85 km || 
|-id=018 bgcolor=#fefefe
| 18 Melpomene || A852 MA ||  || June 24, 1852 || London || J. R. Hind || — || align=right | 140 km || 
|-id=019 bgcolor=#fefefe
| 19 Fortuna || A852 QA ||  || August 22, 1852 || London || J. R. Hind || — || align=right | 200 km || 
|-id=020 bgcolor=#fefefe
| 20 Massalia || A852 SA ||  || September 19, 1852 || Naples || A. de Gasparis || MAS || align=right | 136 km || 
|-id=021 bgcolor=#fefefe
| 21 Lutetia || A852 VA ||  || November 15, 1852 || Paris || H. Goldschmidt || — || align=right | 96 km || 
|-id=022 bgcolor=#d6d6d6
| 22 Kalliope || A852 WA ||  || November 16, 1852 || London || J. R. Hind || moon || align=right | 168 km || 
|-id=023 bgcolor=#E9E9E9
| 23 Thalia || A852 XA ||  || December 15, 1852 || London || J. R. Hind || — || align=right | 108 km || 
|-id=024 bgcolor=#d6d6d6
| 24 Themis || A853 GA ||  || April 5, 1853 || Naples || A. de Gasparis || THM || align=right | 198 km || 
|-id=025 bgcolor=#fefefe
| 25 Phocaea || A853 GB ||  || April 6, 1853 || Marseilles || J. Chacornac || PHO || align=right | 61 km || 
|-id=026 bgcolor=#E9E9E9
| 26 Proserpina || A853 JA ||  || May 5, 1853 || Düsseldorf || R. Luther || — || align=right | 95 km || 
|-id=027 bgcolor=#fefefe
| 27 Euterpe || A853 VA ||  || November 8, 1853 || London || J. R. Hind || EUT || align=right | 96 km || 
|-id=028 bgcolor=#E9E9E9
| 28 Bellona || A854 EA ||  || March 1, 1854 || Düsseldorf || R. Luther || — || align=right | 121 km || 
|-id=029 bgcolor=#E9E9E9
| 29 Amphitrite || A854 EB ||  || March 1, 1854 || London || A. Marth || — || align=right | 190 km || 
|-id=030 bgcolor=#fefefe
| 30 Urania || A854 OA ||  || July 22, 1854 || London || J. R. Hind || — || align=right | 93 km || 
|-id=031 bgcolor=#d6d6d6
| 31 Euphrosyne || A854 RA ||  || September 1, 1854 || Washington || J. Ferguson || EUPmoon || align=right | 267 km || 
|-id=032 bgcolor=#E9E9E9
| 32 Pomona || A854 UA ||  || October 26, 1854 || Paris || H. Goldschmidt || — || align=right | 81 km || mkm
|-id=033 bgcolor=#d6d6d6
| 33 Polyhymnia || A854 UB ||  || October 28, 1854 || Paris || J. Chacornac || — || align=right | 53 km || 
|-id=034 bgcolor=#E9E9E9
| 34 Circe || A855 GA ||  || April 6, 1855 || Paris || J. Chacornac || — || align=right | 133 km || 
|-id=035 bgcolor=#d6d6d6
| 35 Leukothea || A855 HA ||  || April 19, 1855 || Düsseldorf || R. Luther || — || align=right | 103 km || 
|-id=036 bgcolor=#E9E9E9
| 36 Atalante || A855 TA ||  || October 5, 1855 || Paris || H. Goldschmidt || — || align=right | 133 km || 
|-id=037 bgcolor=#E9E9E9
| 37 Fides || A855 TB ||  || October 5, 1855 || Düsseldorf || R. Luther || — || align=right | 108 km || 
|-id=038 bgcolor=#E9E9E9
| 38 Leda || A856 AA ||  || January 12, 1856 || Paris || J. Chacornac || — || align=right | 92 km || 
|-id=039 bgcolor=#E9E9E9
| 39 Laetitia || A856 CA ||  || February 8, 1856 || Paris || J. Chacornac || — || align=right | 179 km || 
|-id=040 bgcolor=#fefefe
| 40 Harmonia || A856 FA ||  || March 31, 1856 || Paris || H. Goldschmidt || — || align=right | 111 km || 
|-id=041 bgcolor=#E9E9E9
| 41 Daphne || A856 KA ||  || May 22, 1856 || Paris || H. Goldschmidt || moon || align=right | 205 km || 
|-id=042 bgcolor=#fefefe
| 42 Isis || A856 KB ||  || May 23, 1856 || Oxford || N. R. Pogson || — || align=right | 111 km || 
|-id=043 bgcolor=#fefefe
| 43 Ariadne || A857 GA ||  || April 15, 1857 || Oxford || N. R. Pogson || FLO || align=right | 71 km || 
|-id=044 bgcolor=#fefefe
| 44 Nysa || A857 KA ||  || May 27, 1857 || Paris || H. Goldschmidt || NYS || align=right | 71 km || 
|-id=045 bgcolor=#E9E9E9
| 45 Eugenia || A857 MA ||  || June 27, 1857 || Paris || H. Goldschmidt || moon || align=right | 202 km || 
|-id=046 bgcolor=#E9E9E9
| 46 Hestia || A857 QA ||  || August 16, 1857 || Oxford || N. R. Pogson || — || align=right | 131 km || 
|-id=047 bgcolor=#d6d6d6
| 47 Aglaja || A857 RA ||  || September 15, 1857 || Düsseldorf || R. Luther || — || align=right | 168 km || 
|-id=048 bgcolor=#d6d6d6
| 48 Doris || A857 SA ||  || September 19, 1857 || Paris || H. Goldschmidt || — || align=right | 216 km || 
|-id=049 bgcolor=#d6d6d6
| 49 Pales || A857 SB ||  || September 19, 1857 || Paris || H. Goldschmidt || — || align=right | 166 km || 
|-id=050 bgcolor=#E9E9E9
| 50 Virginia || A857 TA ||  || October 4, 1857 || Washington || J. Ferguson || — || align=right | 84 km || 
|-id=051 bgcolor=#fefefe
| 51 Nemausa || A858 BA ||  || January 22, 1858 || Nîmes || J. J. P. Laurent || — || align=right | 138 km || 
|-id=052 bgcolor=#d6d6d6
| 52 Europa || A858 CA ||  || February 4, 1858 || Paris || H. Goldschmidt || HYG || align=right | 304 km || 
|-id=053 bgcolor=#E9E9E9
| 53 Kalypso || A858 GA ||  || April 4, 1858 || Düsseldorf || R. Luther || — || align=right | 97 km || 
|-id=054 bgcolor=#E9E9E9
| 54 Alexandra || A858 RA ||  || September 10, 1858 || Paris || H. Goldschmidt || — || align=right | 160 km || 
|-id=055 bgcolor=#E9E9E9
| 55 Pandora || A858 RB ||  || September 10, 1858 || Albany || G. Searle || — || align=right | 85 km || 
|-id=056 bgcolor=#E9E9E9
| 56 Melete || A857 RB ||  || September 9, 1857 || Paris || H. Goldschmidt || — || align=right | 121 km || 
|-id=057 bgcolor=#d6d6d6
| 57 Mnemosyne || A859 SA ||  || September 22, 1859 || Düsseldorf || R. Luther || — || align=right | 113 km || 
|-id=058 bgcolor=#E9E9E9
| 58 Concordia || A860 FA ||  || March 24, 1860 || Düsseldorf || R. Luther || NEM || align=right | 107 km || 
|-id=059 bgcolor=#E9E9E9
| 59 Elpis || A860 RA ||  || September 12, 1860 || Paris || J. Chacornac || — || align=right | 165 km || 
|-id=060 bgcolor=#fefefe
| 60 Echo || A860 RB ||  || September 14, 1860 || Washington || J. Ferguson || — || align=right | 43 km || 
|-id=061 bgcolor=#d6d6d6
| 61 Danaë || A860 RC ||  || September 9, 1860 || Paris || H. Goldschmidt || — || align=right | 86 km || 
|-id=062 bgcolor=#d6d6d6
| 62 Erato || A860 RD ||  || September 14, 1860 || Berlin || O. Lesser, W. Förster || THM || align=right | 107 km || 
|-id=063 bgcolor=#fefefe
| 63 Ausonia || A861 CA ||  || February 10, 1861 || Naples || A. de Gasparis || V || align=right | 116 km || 
|-id=064 bgcolor=#E9E9E9
| 64 Angelina || A861 EA ||  || March 4, 1861 || Marseilles || E. W. Tempel || — || align=right | 58 km || 
|-id=065 bgcolor=#d6d6d6
| 65 Cybele || A861 EB ||  || March 8, 1861 || Marseilles || E. W. Tempel || 7:4 || align=right | 237 km || 
|-id=066 bgcolor=#E9E9E9
| 66 Maja || A861 GA ||  || April 9, 1861 || Cambridge || H. P. Tuttle || — || align=right | 72 km || 
|-id=067 bgcolor=#fefefe
| 67 Asia || A861 HA ||  || April 17, 1861 || Madras || N. R. Pogson || — || align=right | 56 km || 
|-id=068 bgcolor=#E9E9E9
| 68 Leto || A861 HB ||  || April 29, 1861 || Düsseldorf || R. Luther || — || align=right | 123 km || 
|-id=069 bgcolor=#d6d6d6
| 69 Hesperia || A861 HC ||  || April 29, 1861 || Milan || G. Schiaparelli || — || align=right | 138 km || 
|-id=070 bgcolor=#E9E9E9
| 70 Panopaea || A861 JA ||  || May 5, 1861 || Paris || H. Goldschmidt || — || align=right | 128 km || 
|-id=071 bgcolor=#E9E9E9
| 71 Niobe || A861 PA ||  || August 13, 1861 || Düsseldorf || R. Luther || GAL || align=right | 83 km || 
|-id=072 bgcolor=#fefefe
| 72 Feronia || A861 KA ||  || May 29, 1861 || Clinton || C. H. F. Peters || — || align=right | 75 km || 
|-id=073 bgcolor=#E9E9E9
| 73 Klytia || A862 GA ||  || April 7, 1862 || Cambridge || H. P. Tuttle || — || align=right | 45 km || 
|-id=074 bgcolor=#E9E9E9
| 74 Galatea || A862 QA ||  || August 29, 1862 || Marseilles || E. W. Tempel || — || align=right | 119 km || 
|-id=075 bgcolor=#E9E9E9
| 75 Eurydike || A862 SA ||  || September 22, 1862 || Clinton || C. H. F. Peters || — || align=right | 62 km || 
|-id=076 bgcolor=#d6d6d6
| 76 Freia || A862 UA ||  || October 21, 1862 || Copenhagen Observatory || H. d'Arrest || 7:4 || align=right | 145 km || 
|-id=077 bgcolor=#E9E9E9
| 77 Frigga || A862 VA ||  || November 12, 1862 || Clinton || C. H. F. Peters || — || align=right | 61 km || 
|-id=078 bgcolor=#E9E9E9
| 78 Diana || A863 EA ||  || March 15, 1863 || Düsseldorf || R. Luther || — || align=right | 121 km || 
|-id=079 bgcolor=#fefefe
| 79 Eurynome || A863 RA ||  || September 14, 1863 || Ann Arbor || J. C. Watson || — || align=right | 63 km || 
|-id=080 bgcolor=#fefefe
| 80 Sappho || A864 JA ||  || May 2, 1864 || Madras || N. R. Pogson || — || align=right | 69 km || 
|-id=081 bgcolor=#d6d6d6
| 81 Terpsichore || A864 SA ||  || September 30, 1864 || Marseilles || E. W. Tempel || TRP || align=right | 118 km || 
|-id=082 bgcolor=#E9E9E9
| 82 Alkmene || A864 WA ||  || November 27, 1864 || Düsseldorf || R. Luther || — || align=right | 58 km || 
|-id=083 bgcolor=#fefefe
| 83 Beatrix || A865 HA ||  || April 26, 1865 || Naples || A. de Gasparis || — || align=right | 111 km || 
|-id=084 bgcolor=#fefefe
| 84 Klio || A865 QA ||  || August 25, 1865 || Düsseldorf || R. Luther || KLI || align=right | 79 km || 
|-id=085 bgcolor=#E9E9E9
| 85 Io || A865 SA ||  || September 19, 1865 || Clinton || C. H. F. Peters || EUN || align=right | 155 km || 
|-id=086 bgcolor=#d6d6d6
| 86 Semele || A866 AA ||  || January 4, 1866 || Berlin || F. Tietjen || — || align=right | 110 km || 
|-id=087 bgcolor=#d6d6d6
| 87 Sylvia || A866 KA ||  || May 16, 1866 || Madras || N. R. Pogson || SYL7:4moon || align=right | 253 km || 
|-id=088 bgcolor=#E9E9E9
| 88 Thisbe || A866 LA ||  || June 15, 1866 || Clinton || C. H. F. Peters || — || align=right | 232 km || 
|-id=089 bgcolor=#E9E9E9
| 89 Julia || A866 PA ||  || August 6, 1866 || Marseilles || É. Stephan || JUL || align=right | 145 km || 
|-id=090 bgcolor=#d6d6d6
| 90 Antiope || A866 TA ||  || October 1, 1866 || Düsseldorf || R. Luther || THMmoon || align=right | 116 km || 
|-id=091 bgcolor=#E9E9E9
| 91 Aegina || A866 VA ||  || November 4, 1866 || Marseilles || É. Stephan || — || align=right | 103 km || 
|-id=092 bgcolor=#d6d6d6
| 92 Undina || A867 NA ||  || July 7, 1867 || Clinton || C. H. F. Peters || — || align=right | 126 km || 
|-id=093 bgcolor=#E9E9E9
| 93 Minerva || A867 QA ||  || August 24, 1867 || Ann Arbor || J. C. Watson || GEFmoon || align=right | 154 km || 
|-id=094 bgcolor=#d6d6d6
| 94 Aurora || A867 RA ||  || September 6, 1867 || Ann Arbor || J. C. Watson || — || align=right | 205 km || 
|-id=095 bgcolor=#d6d6d6
| 95 Arethusa || A867 WA ||  || November 23, 1867 || Düsseldorf || R. Luther || — || align=right | 148 km || 
|-id=096 bgcolor=#d6d6d6
| 96 Aegle || A868 DA ||  || February 17, 1868 || Marseilles || J. Coggia || AEG || align=right | 178 km || 
|-id=097 bgcolor=#E9E9E9
| 97 Klotho || A868 DB ||  || February 17, 1868 || Marseilles || E. W. Tempel || — || align=right | 101 km || 
|-id=098 bgcolor=#E9E9E9
| 98 Ianthe || A868 HA ||  || April 18, 1868 || Clinton || C. H. F. Peters || — || align=right | 133 km || 
|-id=099 bgcolor=#E9E9E9
| 99 Dike || A868 KA ||  || May 28, 1868 || Marseilles || A. Borrelly || MIT || align=right | 67 km || 
|-id=100 bgcolor=#d6d6d6
| 100 Hekate || A868 NA ||  || July 11, 1868 || Ann Arbor || J. C. Watson || HYG || align=right | 86 km || 
|}

101–200 

|-bgcolor=#E9E9E9
| 101 Helena || A868 PA ||  || August 15, 1868 || Ann Arbor || J. C. Watson || — || align=right | 66 km || 
|-id=102 bgcolor=#E9E9E9
| 102 Miriam || A868 QA ||  || August 22, 1868 || Clinton || C. H. F. Peters || — || align=right | 83 km || 
|-id=103 bgcolor=#E9E9E9
| 103 Hera || A868 RA ||  || September 7, 1868 || Ann Arbor || J. C. Watson || — || align=right | 84 km || 
|-id=104 bgcolor=#d6d6d6
| 104 Klymene || A868 RB ||  || September 13, 1868 || Ann Arbor || J. C. Watson || — || align=right | 137 km || 
|-id=105 bgcolor=#fefefe
| 105 Artemis || A868 SA ||  || September 16, 1868 || Ann Arbor || J. C. Watson || — || align=right | 95 km || 
|-id=106 bgcolor=#d6d6d6
| 106 Dione || A868 TA ||  || October 10, 1868 || Ann Arbor || J. C. Watson || — || align=right | 208 km || 
|-id=107 bgcolor=#d6d6d6
| 107 Camilla || A868 WA ||  || November 17, 1868 || Madras || N. R. Pogson || SYL7:4moon || align=right | 210 km || 
|-id=108 bgcolor=#d6d6d6
| 108 Hecuba || A869 GB ||  || April 2, 1869 || Düsseldorf || R. Luther || HYG || align=right | 75 km || 
|-id=109 bgcolor=#E9E9E9
| 109 Felicitas || A869 TA ||  || October 9, 1869 || Clinton || C. H. F. Peters || — || align=right | 83 km || 
|-id=110 bgcolor=#E9E9E9
| 110 Lydia || A870 HA ||  || April 19, 1870 || Marseilles || A. Borrelly || PAD || align=right | 86 km || 
|-id=111 bgcolor=#E9E9E9
| 111 Ate || A870 PA ||  || August 14, 1870 || Clinton || C. H. F. Peters || — || align=right | 126 km || 
|-id=112 bgcolor=#fefefe
| 112 Iphigenia || A870 SA ||  || September 19, 1870 || Clinton || C. H. F. Peters || — || align=right | 70 km || 
|-id=113 bgcolor=#fefefe
| 113 Amalthea || A871 EA ||  || March 12, 1871 || Düsseldorf || R. Luther || FLO || align=right | 50 km || 
|-id=114 bgcolor=#E9E9E9
| 114 Kassandra || A871 OA ||  || July 23, 1871 || Clinton || C. H. F. Peters || — || align=right | 94 km || 
|-id=115 bgcolor=#fefefe
| 115 Thyra || A871 PA ||  || August 6, 1871 || Ann Arbor || J. C. Watson || — || align=right | 80 km || 
|-id=116 bgcolor=#E9E9E9
| 116 Sirona || A871 RA ||  || September 8, 1871 || Clinton || C. H. F. Peters || — || align=right | 72 km || 
|-id=117 bgcolor=#d6d6d6
| 117 Lomia || A871 RB ||  || September 12, 1871 || Marseilles || A. Borrelly || — || align=right | 209 km || 
|-id=118 bgcolor=#fefefe
| 118 Peitho || A872 EA ||  || March 15, 1872 || Düsseldorf || R. Luther || — || align=right | 40 km || 
|-id=119 bgcolor=#E9E9E9
| 119 Althaea || A872 GA ||  || April 3, 1872 || Ann Arbor || J. C. Watson || — || align=right | 57 km || 
|-id=120 bgcolor=#d6d6d6
| 120 Lachesis || A872 GB ||  || April 10, 1872 || Marseilles || A. Borrelly || — || align=right | 155 km || 
|-id=121 bgcolor=#d6d6d6
| 121 Hermione || A872 JA ||  || May 12, 1872 || Ann Arbor || J. C. Watson || 7:4moon || align=right | 209 km || 
|-id=122 bgcolor=#d6d6d6
| 122 Gerda || A872 OA ||  || July 31, 1872 || Clinton || C. H. F. Peters || — || align=right | 71 km || 
|-id=123 bgcolor=#E9E9E9
| 123 Brunhild || A872 OB ||  || July 31, 1872 || Clinton || C. H. F. Peters || — || align=right | 45 km || 
|-id=124 bgcolor=#E9E9E9
| 124 Alkeste || A872 QA ||  || August 23, 1872 || Clinton || C. H. F. Peters || — || align=right | 89 km || 
|-id=125 bgcolor=#E9E9E9
| 125 Liberatrix || A872 RA ||  || September 11, 1872 || Paris || P. M. Henry || NEM || align=right | 48 km || 
|-id=126 bgcolor=#fefefe
| 126 Velleda || A872 VA ||  || November 5, 1872 || Paris || P. P. Henry || — || align=right | 45 km || 
|-id=127 bgcolor=#E9E9E9
| 127 Johanna || A872 VB ||  || November 5, 1872 || Paris || P. M. Henry || — || align=right | 122 km || 
|-id=128 bgcolor=#E9E9E9
| 128 Nemesis || A872 WA ||  || November 25, 1872 || Ann Arbor || J. C. Watson || NEM || align=right | 163 km || 
|-id=129 bgcolor=#d6d6d6
| 129 Antigone || A873 CA ||  || February 5, 1873 || Clinton || C. H. F. Peters || — || align=right | 113 km || 
|-id=130 bgcolor=#d6d6d6
| 130 Elektra || A873 DA ||  || February 17, 1873 || Clinton || C. H. F. Peters || moon || align=right | 181 km || 
|-id=131 bgcolor=#fefefe
| 131 Vala || A873 KA ||  || May 24, 1873 || Clinton || C. H. F. Peters || — || align=right | 31 km || 
|-id=132 bgcolor=#FA8072
| 132 Aethra || A873 LA ||  || June 13, 1873 || Ann Arbor || J. C. Watson || — || align=right | 43 km || 
|-id=133 bgcolor=#d6d6d6
| 133 Cyrene || A873 QA ||  || August 16, 1873 || Ann Arbor || J. C. Watson || — || align=right | 72 km || 
|-id=134 bgcolor=#E9E9E9
| 134 Sophrosyne || A873 SA ||  || September 27, 1873 || Düsseldorf || R. Luther || — || align=right | 108 km || 
|-id=135 bgcolor=#fefefe
| 135 Hertha || A874 DA ||  || February 18, 1874 || Clinton || C. H. F. Peters || NYS || align=right | 79 km || 
|-id=136 bgcolor=#fefefe
| 136 Austria || A874 FA ||  || March 18, 1874 || Pola || J. Palisa || — || align=right | 37 km || 
|-id=137 bgcolor=#d6d6d6
| 137 Meliboea || A874 HA ||  || April 21, 1874 || Pula || J. Palisa || MEL || align=right | 129 km || 
|-id=138 bgcolor=#fefefe
| 138 Tolosa || A874 KA ||  || May 19, 1874 || Toulouse || J. Perrotin || — || align=right | 53 km || 
|-id=139 bgcolor=#E9E9E9
| 139 Juewa || A874 TA ||  || October 10, 1874 || Beijing || J. C. Watson || — || align=right | 151 km || 
|-id=140 bgcolor=#E9E9E9
| 140 Siwa || A874 TB ||  || October 13, 1874 || Pola || J. Palisa || — || align=right | 110 km || 
|-id=141 bgcolor=#E9E9E9
| 141 Lumen || A875 AA ||  || January 13, 1875 || Paris || P. P. Henry || EUN || align=right | 118 km || 
|-id=142 bgcolor=#fefefe
| 142 Polana || A875 BA ||  || January 28, 1875 || Pola || J. Palisa || NYS || align=right | 55 km || 
|-id=143 bgcolor=#E9E9E9
| 143 Adria || A875 DA ||  || February 23, 1875 || Pula || J. Palisa || — || align=right | 95 km || 
|-id=144 bgcolor=#E9E9E9
| 144 Vibilia || A875 LA ||  || June 3, 1875 || Clinton || C. H. F. Peters || — || align=right | 142 km || 
|-id=145 bgcolor=#E9E9E9
| 145 Adeona || A875 LB ||  || June 3, 1875 || Clinton || C. H. F. Peters || ADE || align=right | 128 km || 
|-id=146 bgcolor=#E9E9E9
| 146 Lucina || — ||  || June 8, 1875 || Marseilles || A. Borrelly || — || align=right | 160 km || 
|-id=147 bgcolor=#d6d6d6
| 147 Protogeneia || — ||  || July 10, 1875 || Vienna || L. Schulhof || — || align=right | 133 km || 
|-id=148 bgcolor=#E9E9E9
| 148 Gallia || — ||  || August 7, 1875 || Paris || P. M. Henry || GAL || align=right | 98 km || 
|-id=149 bgcolor=#fefefe
| 149 Medusa || — ||  || September 21, 1875 || Toulouse || J. Perrotin || — || align=right | 24 km || 
|-id=150 bgcolor=#d6d6d6
| 150 Nuwa || — ||  || October 18, 1875 || Ann Arbor || J. C. Watson || — || align=right | 119 km || 
|-id=151 bgcolor=#E9E9E9
| 151 Abundantia || — ||  || November 1, 1875 || Pola || J. Palisa || — || align=right | 39 km || 
|-id=152 bgcolor=#d6d6d6
| 152 Atala || — ||  || November 2, 1875 || Paris || P. P. Henry || — || align=right | 59 km || 
|-id=153 bgcolor=#d6d6d6
| 153 Hilda || — ||  || November 2, 1875 || Pola || J. Palisa || HIL3:2 || align=right | 171 km || 
|-id=154 bgcolor=#d6d6d6
| 154 Bertha || — ||  || November 4, 1875 || Paris || P. M. Henry || — || align=right | 193 km || 
|-id=155 bgcolor=#E9E9E9
| 155 Scylla || — ||  || November 8, 1875 || Pola || J. Palisa || — || align=right | 40 km || 
|-id=156 bgcolor=#E9E9E9
| 156 Xanthippe || — ||  || November 22, 1875 || Pula || J. Palisa || — || align=right | 143 km || 
|-id=157 bgcolor=#E9E9E9
| 157 Dejanira || — ||  || December 1, 1875 || Marseilles || A. Borrelly || — || align=right | 20 km || 
|-id=158 bgcolor=#d6d6d6
| 158 Koronis || — ||  || January 4, 1876 || Berlin || V. Knorre || KOR || align=right | 39 km || 
|-id=159 bgcolor=#d6d6d6
| 159 Aemilia || — ||  || January 26, 1876 || Paris || P. P. Henry || HYG || align=right | 125 km || 
|-id=160 bgcolor=#E9E9E9
| 160 Una || — ||  || February 20, 1876 || Clinton || C. H. F. Peters || — || align=right | 81 km || 
|-id=161 bgcolor=#fefefe
| 161 Athor || — ||  || April 19, 1876 || Ann Arbor || J. C. Watson || — || align=right | 41 km || 
|-id=162 bgcolor=#d6d6d6
| 162 Laurentia || — ||  || April 21, 1876 || Paris || P. M. Henry || — || align=right | 97 km || 
|-id=163 bgcolor=#fefefe
| 163 Erigone || — ||  || April 26, 1876 || Toulouse || J. Perrotin || ERI || align=right | 82 km || 
|-id=164 bgcolor=#E9E9E9
| 164 Eva || — ||  || July 12, 1876 || Paris || P. P. Henry || — || align=right | 100 km || 
|-id=165 bgcolor=#d6d6d6
| 165 Loreley || — ||  || August 9, 1876 || Clinton || C. H. F. Peters || — || align=right | 180 km || 
|-id=166 bgcolor=#E9E9E9
| 166 Rhodope || — ||  || August 15, 1876 || Clinton || C. H. F. Peters || — || align=right | 52 km || 
|-id=167 bgcolor=#d6d6d6
| 167 Urda || — ||  || August 28, 1876 || Clinton || C. H. F. Peters || KOR || align=right | 40 km || 
|-id=168 bgcolor=#d6d6d6
| 168 Sibylla || — ||  || September 28, 1876 || Ann Arbor || J. C. Watson || 7:4 || align=right | 145 km || 
|-id=169 bgcolor=#fefefe
| 169 Zelia || — ||  || September 28, 1876 || Paris || P. M. Henry || — || align=right | 38 km || 
|-id=170 bgcolor=#E9E9E9
| 170 Maria || — ||  || January 10, 1877 || Toulouse || J. Perrotin || MAR || align=right | 33 km || 
|-id=171 bgcolor=#d6d6d6
| 171 Ophelia || — ||  || January 13, 1877 || Marseilles || A. Borrelly || THM || align=right | 131 km || 
|-id=172 bgcolor=#fefefe
| 172 Baucis || — ||  || February 5, 1877 || Marseilles || A. Borrelly || — || align=right | 62 km || 
|-id=173 bgcolor=#E9E9E9
| 173 Ino || — ||  || August 1, 1877 || Marseilles || A. Borrelly || INO || align=right | 126 km || 
|-id=174 bgcolor=#d6d6d6
| 174 Phaedra || — ||  || September 2, 1877 || Ann Arbor || J. C. Watson || — || align=right | 65 km || 
|-id=175 bgcolor=#d6d6d6
| 175 Andromache || — ||  || October 1, 1877 || Ann Arbor || J. C. Watson || — || align=right | 95 km || 
|-id=176 bgcolor=#d6d6d6
| 176 Iduna || — ||  || October 14, 1877 || Clinton || C. H. F. Peters || — || align=right | 107 km || 
|-id=177 bgcolor=#E9E9E9
| 177 Irma || — ||  || November 5, 1877 || Paris || P. P. Henry || — || align=right | 69 km || 
|-id=178 bgcolor=#fefefe
| 178 Belisana || — ||  || November 6, 1877 || Pola || J. Palisa || — || align=right | 36 km || 
|-id=179 bgcolor=#d6d6d6
| 179 Klytaemnestra || — ||  || November 11, 1877 || Ann Arbor || J. C. Watson || TEL || align=right | 70 km || 
|-id=180 bgcolor=#E9E9E9
| 180 Garumna || — ||  || January 29, 1878 || Toulouse || J. Perrotin || — || align=right | 23 km || 
|-id=181 bgcolor=#d6d6d6
| 181 Eucharis || — ||  || February 2, 1878 || Marseilles || P. Cottenot || — || align=right | 115 km || 
|-id=182 bgcolor=#fefefe
| 182 Elsa || — ||  || February 7, 1878 || Pola || J. Palisa || MAS || align=right | 40 km || 
|-id=183 bgcolor=#E9E9E9
| 183 Istria || — ||  || February 8, 1878 || Pula || J. Palisa || — || align=right | 33 km || 
|-id=184 bgcolor=#d6d6d6
| 184 Dejopeja || — ||  || February 28, 1878 || Pula || J. Palisa || — || align=right | 62 km || 
|-id=185 bgcolor=#E9E9E9
| 185 Eunike || — ||  || March 1, 1878 || Clinton || C. H. F. Peters || — || align=right | 160 km || 
|-id=186 bgcolor=#fefefe
| 186 Celuta || — ||  || April 6, 1878 || Paris || P. M. Henry || — || align=right | 50 km || 
|-id=187 bgcolor=#E9E9E9
| 187 Lamberta || — ||  || April 11, 1878 || Marseilles || J. Coggia || — || align=right | 147 km || 
|-id=188 bgcolor=#E9E9E9
| 188 Menippe || — ||  || June 18, 1878 || Clinton || C. H. F. Peters || — || align=right | 36 km || 
|-id=189 bgcolor=#fefefe
| 189 Phthia || — ||  || September 9, 1878 || Clinton || C. H. F. Peters || — || align=right | 38 km || 
|-id=190 bgcolor=#d6d6d6
| 190 Ismene || — ||  || September 22, 1878 || Clinton || C. H. F. Peters || 3:2 || align=right | 159 km || 
|-id=191 bgcolor=#d6d6d6
| 191 Kolga || — ||  || September 30, 1878 || Clinton || C. H. F. Peters || — || align=right | 95 km || 
|-id=192 bgcolor=#fefefe
| 192 Nausikaa || — ||  || February 17, 1879 || Pola || J. Palisa || — || align=right | 99 km || 
|-id=193 bgcolor=#E9E9E9
| 193 Ambrosia || — ||  || February 28, 1879 || Marseilles || J. Coggia || — || align=right | 26 km || 
|-id=194 bgcolor=#E9E9E9
| 194 Prokne || — ||  || March 21, 1879 || Clinton || C. H. F. Peters || — || align=right | 162 km || 
|-id=195 bgcolor=#d6d6d6
| 195 Eurykleia || — ||  || April 19, 1879 || Pola || J. Palisa || — || align=right | 93 km || 
|-id=196 bgcolor=#d6d6d6
| 196 Philomela || — ||  || May 14, 1879 || Clinton || C. H. F. Peters || — || align=right | 145 km || 
|-id=197 bgcolor=#E9E9E9
| 197 Arete || — ||  || May 21, 1879 || Pola || J. Palisa || — || align=right | 32 km || 
|-id=198 bgcolor=#fefefe
| 198 Ampella || — ||  || June 13, 1879 || Marseilles || A. Borrelly || — || align=right | 54 km || 
|-id=199 bgcolor=#d6d6d6
| 199 Byblis || — ||  || July 9, 1879 || Clinton || C. H. F. Peters || — || align=right | 76 km || 
|-id=200 bgcolor=#E9E9E9
| 200 Dynamene || — ||  || July 27, 1879 || Clinton || C. H. F. Peters || — || align=right | 128 km || 
|}

201–300 

|-bgcolor=#E9E9E9
| 201 Penelope || — ||  || August 7, 1879 || Pola || J. Palisa || — || align=right | 86 km || 
|-id=202 bgcolor=#d6d6d6
| 202 Chryseïs || — ||  || September 11, 1879 || Clinton || C. H. F. Peters || — || align=right | 86 km || 
|-id=203 bgcolor=#E9E9E9
| 203 Pompeja || — ||  || September 25, 1879 || Clinton || C. H. F. Peters || — || align=right | 125 km || 
|-id=204 bgcolor=#E9E9E9
| 204 Kallisto || — ||  || October 8, 1879 || Pula || J. Palisa || — || align=right | 49 km || 
|-id=205 bgcolor=#E9E9E9
| 205 Martha || — ||  || October 13, 1879 || Pula || J. Palisa || — || align=right | 77 km || 
|-id=206 bgcolor=#E9E9E9
| 206 Hersilia || — ||  || October 13, 1879 || Clinton || C. H. F. Peters || — || align=right | 113 km || 
|-id=207 bgcolor=#fefefe
| 207 Hedda || — ||  || October 17, 1879 || Pula || J. Palisa || — || align=right | 58 km || 
|-id=208 bgcolor=#d6d6d6
| 208 Lacrimosa || — ||  || October 21, 1879 || Pula || J. Palisa || KOR || align=right | 40 km || 
|-id=209 bgcolor=#d6d6d6
| 209 Dido || — ||  || October 22, 1879 || Clinton || C. H. F. Peters || — || align=right | 179 km || 
|-id=210 bgcolor=#E9E9E9
| 210 Isabella || — ||  || November 12, 1879 || Pula || J. Palisa || NEM || align=right | 87 km || 
|-id=211 bgcolor=#d6d6d6
| 211 Isolda || — ||  || December 10, 1879 || Pula || J. Palisa || — || align=right | 141 km || 
|-id=212 bgcolor=#d6d6d6
| 212 Medea || — ||  || February 6, 1880 || Pula || J. Palisa || — || align=right | 136 km || 
|-id=213 bgcolor=#E9E9E9
| 213 Lilaea || — ||  || February 16, 1880 || Clinton || C. H. F. Peters || — || align=right | 82 km || 
|-id=214 bgcolor=#E9E9E9
| 214 Aschera || — ||  || February 29, 1880 || Pula || J. Palisa || — || align=right | 25 km || 
|-id=215 bgcolor=#E9E9E9
| 215 Oenone || — ||  || April 7, 1880 || Berlin || V. Knorre || — || align=right | 35 km || 
|-id=216 bgcolor=#E9E9E9
| 216 Kleopatra || — ||  || April 10, 1880 || Pula || J. Palisa || moon || align=right | 122 km || 
|-id=217 bgcolor=#d6d6d6
| 217 Eudora || — ||  || August 30, 1880 || Marseilles || J. Coggia || — || align=right | 65 km || 
|-id=218 bgcolor=#E9E9E9
| 218 Bianca || — ||  || September 4, 1880 || Pula || J. Palisa || — || align=right | 61 km || 
|-id=219 bgcolor=#fefefe
| 219 Thusnelda || — ||  || September 30, 1880 || Pula || J. Palisa || — || align=right | 38 km || 
|-id=220 bgcolor=#fefefe
| 220 Stephania || — ||  || May 19, 1881 || Vienna || J. Palisa || — || align=right | 32 km || 
|-id=221 bgcolor=#d6d6d6
| 221 Eos || — ||  || January 18, 1882 || Vienna || J. Palisa || EOS || align=right | 95 km || 
|-id=222 bgcolor=#d6d6d6
| 222 Lucia || — ||  || February 9, 1882 || Vienna || J. Palisa || THM || align=right | 55 km || 
|-id=223 bgcolor=#d6d6d6
| 223 Rosa || — ||  || March 9, 1882 || Vienna || J. Palisa || THM || align=right | 80 km || 
|-id=224 bgcolor=#E9E9E9
| 224 Oceana || — ||  || March 30, 1882 || Vienna || J. Palisa || — || align=right | 58 km || 
|-id=225 bgcolor=#d6d6d6
| 225 Henrietta || — ||  || April 19, 1882 || Vienna || J. Palisa || 7:4 || align=right | 96 km || 
|-id=226 bgcolor=#E9E9E9
| 226 Weringia || — ||  || July 19, 1882 || Vienna || J. Palisa || — || align=right | 31 km || 
|-id=227 bgcolor=#d6d6d6
| 227 Philosophia || — ||  || August 12, 1882 || Paris || P. P. Henry || — || align=right | 124 km || 
|-id=228 bgcolor=#fefefe
| 228 Agathe || — ||  || August 19, 1882 || Vienna || J. Palisa || — || align=right | 9.3 km || 
|-id=229 bgcolor=#d6d6d6
| 229 Adelinda || — ||  || August 22, 1882 || Vienna || J. Palisa || 7:4 || align=right | 106 km || 
|-id=230 bgcolor=#fefefe
| 230 Athamantis || — ||  || September 3, 1882 || Bothkamp || K. de Ball || — || align=right | 111 km || 
|-id=231 bgcolor=#d6d6d6
| 231 Vindobona || — ||  || September 10, 1882 || Vienna || J. Palisa || — || align=right | 74 km || 
|-id=232 bgcolor=#E9E9E9
| 232 Russia || — ||  || January 31, 1883 || Vienna || J. Palisa || — || align=right | 55 km || 
|-id=233 bgcolor=#E9E9E9
| 233 Asterope || — ||  || May 11, 1883 || Marseilles || A. Borrelly || — || align=right | 100 km || 
|-id=234 bgcolor=#fefefe
| 234 Barbara || — ||  || August 12, 1883 || Clinton || C. H. F. Peters || — || align=right | 45 km || 
|-id=235 bgcolor=#d6d6d6
| 235 Carolina || — ||  || November 28, 1883 || Vienna || J. Palisa || — || align=right | 58 km || 
|-id=236 bgcolor=#E9E9E9
| 236 Honoria || — ||  || April 26, 1884 || Vienna || J. Palisa || — || align=right | 78 km || 
|-id=237 bgcolor=#E9E9E9
| 237 Coelestina || — ||  || June 27, 1884 || Vienna || J. Palisa || — || align=right | 41 km || 
|-id=238 bgcolor=#d6d6d6
| 238 Hypatia || — ||  || July 1, 1884 || Berlin || V. Knorre || — || align=right | 156 km || 
|-id=239 bgcolor=#d6d6d6
| 239 Adrastea || — ||  || August 18, 1884 || Vienna || J. Palisa || — || align=right | 38 km || 
|-id=240 bgcolor=#E9E9E9
| 240 Vanadis || — ||  || August 27, 1884 || Marseilles || A. Borrelly || — || align=right | 88 km || 
|-id=241 bgcolor=#d6d6d6
| 241 Germania || — ||  || September 12, 1884 || Düsseldorf || R. Luther || — || align=right | 169 km || 
|-id=242 bgcolor=#d6d6d6
| 242 Kriemhild || — ||  || September 22, 1884 || Vienna || J. Palisa || — || align=right | 41 km || 
|-id=243 bgcolor=#d6d6d6
| 243 Ida || — ||  || September 29, 1884 || Vienna || J. Palisa || KORmoon || align=right | 32 km || 
|-id=244 bgcolor=#fefefe
| 244 Sita || — ||  || October 14, 1884 || Vienna || J. Palisa || slow || align=right | 11 km || 
|-id=245 bgcolor=#d6d6d6
| 245 Vera || — ||  || February 6, 1885 || Madras || N. R. Pogson || — || align=right | 76 km || 
|-id=246 bgcolor=#E9E9E9
| 246 Asporina || — ||  || March 6, 1885 || Marseilles || A. Borrelly || — || align=right | 51 km || 
|-id=247 bgcolor=#E9E9E9
| 247 Eukrate || — ||  || March 14, 1885 || Düsseldorf || R. Luther || — || align=right | 131 km || 
|-id=248 bgcolor=#fefefe
| 248 Lameia || — ||  || June 5, 1885 || Vienna || J. Palisa || — || align=right | 50 km || 
|-id=249 bgcolor=#fefefe
| 249 Ilse || — ||  || August 16, 1885 || Clinton || C. H. F. Peters || — || align=right | 35 km || 
|-id=250 bgcolor=#d6d6d6
| 250 Bettina || — ||  || September 3, 1885 || Vienna || J. Palisa || — || align=right | 121 km || 
|-id=251 bgcolor=#d6d6d6
| 251 Sophia || — ||  || October 4, 1885 || Vienna || J. Palisa || — || align=right | 27 km || 
|-id=252 bgcolor=#d6d6d6
| 252 Clementina || — ||  || October 11, 1885 || Nice || J. Perrotin || — || align=right | 65 km || 
|-id=253 bgcolor=#E9E9E9
| 253 Mathilde || — ||  || November 12, 1885 || Vienna || J. Palisa || slow || align=right | 53 km || 
|-id=254 bgcolor=#fefefe
| 254 Augusta || — ||  || March 31, 1886 || Vienna || J. Palisa || FLO || align=right | 12 km || 
|-id=255 bgcolor=#E9E9E9
| 255 Oppavia || — ||  || March 31, 1886 || Vienna || J. Palisa || GEF || align=right | 57 km || 
|-id=256 bgcolor=#d6d6d6
| 256 Walpurga || — ||  || April 3, 1886 || Vienna || J. Palisa || — || align=right | 67 km || 
|-id=257 bgcolor=#d6d6d6
| 257 Silesia || — ||  || April 5, 1886 || Vienna || J. Palisa || — || align=right | 73 km || 
|-id=258 bgcolor=#E9E9E9
| 258 Tyche || — ||  || May 4, 1886 || Düsseldorf || R. Luther || — || align=right | 65 km || 
|-id=259 bgcolor=#d6d6d6
| 259 Aletheia || — ||  || June 28, 1886 || Clinton || C. H. F. Peters || — || align=right | 174 km || 
|-id=260 bgcolor=#d6d6d6
| 260 Huberta || — ||  || October 3, 1886 || Vienna || J. Palisa || 7:4 || align=right | 102 km || 
|-id=261 bgcolor=#fefefe
| 261 Prymno || — ||  || October 31, 1886 || Clinton || C. H. F. Peters || — || align=right | 50 km || 
|-id=262 bgcolor=#E9E9E9
| 262 Valda || — ||  || November 3, 1886 || Vienna || J. Palisa || — || align=right | 15 km || 
|-id=263 bgcolor=#d6d6d6
| 263 Dresda || — ||  || November 3, 1886 || Vienna || J. Palisa || KOR || align=right | 24 km || 
|-id=264 bgcolor=#E9E9E9
| 264 Libussa || — ||  || December 22, 1886 || Clinton || C. H. F. Peters || — || align=right | 63 km || 
|-id=265 bgcolor=#fefefe
| 265 Anna || — ||  || February 25, 1887 || Vienna || J. Palisa || — || align=right | 23 km || 
|-id=266 bgcolor=#E9E9E9
| 266 Aline || — ||  || May 17, 1887 || Vienna || J. Palisa || — || align=right | 109 km || 
|-id=267 bgcolor=#E9E9E9
| 267 Tirza || — ||  || May 27, 1887 || Nice || A. Charlois || — || align=right | 56 km || 
|-id=268 bgcolor=#d6d6d6
| 268 Adorea || — ||  || June 8, 1887 || Marseilles || A. Borrelly || THM || align=right | 145 km || 
|-id=269 bgcolor=#E9E9E9
| 269 Justitia || — ||  || September 21, 1887 || Vienna || J. Palisa || — || align=right | 51 km || 
|-id=270 bgcolor=#fefefe
| 270 Anahita || — ||  || October 8, 1887 || Clinton || C. H. F. Peters || — || align=right | 51 km || 
|-id=271 bgcolor=#d6d6d6
| 271 Penthesilea || — ||  || October 13, 1887 || Berlin || V. Knorre || — || align=right | 66 km || 
|-id=272 bgcolor=#E9E9E9
| 272 Antonia || — ||  || February 4, 1888 || Nice || A. Charlois || HOF || align=right | 27 km || 
|-id=273 bgcolor=#fefefe
| 273 Atropos || — ||  || March 8, 1888 || Vienna || J. Palisa || — || align=right | 30 km || 
|-id=274 bgcolor=#d6d6d6
| 274 Philagoria || — ||  || April 3, 1888 || Vienna || J. Palisa || — || align=right | 27 km || 
|-id=275 bgcolor=#E9E9E9
| 275 Sapientia || — ||  || April 15, 1888 || Vienna || J. Palisa || — || align=right | 103 km || 
|-id=276 bgcolor=#d6d6d6
| 276 Adelheid || — ||  || April 17, 1888 || Vienna || J. Palisa || ALA || align=right | 115 km || 
|-id=277 bgcolor=#d6d6d6
| 277 Elvira || — ||  || May 3, 1888 || Nice || A. Charlois || KOR || align=right | 30 km || 
|-id=278 bgcolor=#E9E9E9
| 278 Paulina || — ||  || May 16, 1888 || Vienna || J. Palisa || — || align=right | 33 km || 
|-id=279 bgcolor=#d6d6d6
| 279 Thule || — ||  || October 25, 1888 || Vienna || J. Palisa || 4:3 || align=right | 127 km || 
|-id=280 bgcolor=#d6d6d6
| 280 Philia || — ||  || October 29, 1888 || Vienna || J. Palisa || — || align=right | 46 km || 
|-id=281 bgcolor=#fefefe
| 281 Lucretia || — ||  || October 31, 1888 || Vienna || J. Palisa || FLO || align=right | 11 km || 
|-id=282 bgcolor=#fefefe
| 282 Clorinde || — ||  || January 28, 1889 || Nice || A. Charlois || — || align=right | 39 km || 
|-id=283 bgcolor=#d6d6d6
| 283 Emma || — ||  || February 8, 1889 || Nice || A. Charlois || EMAmoon || align=right | 132 km || 
|-id=284 bgcolor=#fefefe
| 284 Amalia || — ||  || May 29, 1889 || Nice || A. Charlois || — || align=right | 53 km || 
|-id=285 bgcolor=#d6d6d6
| 285 Regina || — ||  || August 3, 1889 || Nice || A. Charlois || — || align=right | 47 km || 
|-id=286 bgcolor=#d6d6d6
| 286 Iclea || — ||  || August 3, 1889 || Vienna || J. Palisa || — || align=right | 94 km || 
|-id=287 bgcolor=#fefefe
| 287 Nephthys || — ||  || August 25, 1889 || Clinton || C. H. F. Peters || — || align=right | 60 km || 
|-id=288 bgcolor=#E9E9E9
| 288 Glauke || — ||  || February 20, 1890 || Düsseldorf || R. Luther || slow || align=right | 29 km || 
|-id=289 bgcolor=#d6d6d6
| 289 Nenetta || — ||  || March 10, 1890 || Nice || A. Charlois || — || align=right | 38 km || 
|-id=290 bgcolor=#fefefe
| 290 Bruna || — ||  || March 20, 1890 || Vienna || J. Palisa || PHO || align=right | 9.8 km || 
|-id=291 bgcolor=#fefefe
| 291 Alice || — ||  || April 25, 1890 || Vienna || J. Palisa || — || align=right | 10 km || 
|-id=292 bgcolor=#E9E9E9
| 292 Ludovica || — ||  || April 25, 1890 || Vienna || J. Palisa || — || align=right | 31 km || 
|-id=293 bgcolor=#d6d6d6
| 293 Brasilia || — ||  || May 20, 1890 || Nice || A. Charlois || — || align=right | 57 km || 
|-id=294 bgcolor=#d6d6d6
| 294 Felicia || — ||  || July 15, 1890 || Nice || A. Charlois || — || align=right | 52 km || 
|-id=295 bgcolor=#E9E9E9
| 295 Theresia || — ||  || August 17, 1890 || Vienna || J. Palisa || — || align=right | 28 km || 
|-id=296 bgcolor=#fefefe
| 296 Phaëtusa || — ||  || August 19, 1890 || Nice || A. Charlois || — || align=right | 8.2 km || 
|-id=297 bgcolor=#d6d6d6
| 297 Caecilia || — ||  || September 9, 1890 || Nice || A. Charlois || — || align=right | 39 km || 
|-id=298 bgcolor=#fefefe
| 298 Baptistina || — ||  || September 9, 1890 || Nice || A. Charlois || BAP || align=right | 21 km || 
|-id=299 bgcolor=#fefefe
| 299 Thora || — ||  || October 6, 1890 || Vienna || J. Palisa || slow || align=right | 16 km || 
|-id=300 bgcolor=#d6d6d6
| 300 Geraldina || — ||  || October 3, 1890 || Nice || A. Charlois || — || align=right | 67 km || 
|}

301–400 

|-bgcolor=#E9E9E9
| 301 Bavaria || — ||  || November 16, 1890 || Vienna || J. Palisa || — || align=right | 53 km || 
|-id=302 bgcolor=#fefefe
| 302 Clarissa || — ||  || November 14, 1890 || Nice || A. Charlois || CLA || align=right | 39 km || 
|-id=303 bgcolor=#d6d6d6
| 303 Josephina || — ||  || February 12, 1891 || Rome || E. Millosevich || — || align=right | 125 km || 
|-id=304 bgcolor=#fefefe
| 304 Olga || — ||  || February 14, 1891 || Vienna || J. Palisa || — || align=right | 66 km || 
|-id=305 bgcolor=#d6d6d6
| 305 Gordonia || — ||  || February 16, 1891 || Nice || A. Charlois || — || align=right | 48 km || 
|-id=306 bgcolor=#fefefe
| 306 Unitas || — ||  || March 1, 1891 || Rome || E. Millosevich || — || align=right | 47 km || 
|-id=307 bgcolor=#d6d6d6
| 307 Nike || — ||  || March 5, 1891 || Nice || A. Charlois || — || align=right | 61 km || 
|-id=308 bgcolor=#E9E9E9
| 308 Polyxo || — ||  || March 31, 1891 || Marseilles || A. Borrelly || — || align=right | 129 km || 
|-id=309 bgcolor=#E9E9E9
| 309 Fraternitas || — ||  || April 6, 1891 || Vienna || J. Palisa || — || align=right | 41 km || 
|-id=310 bgcolor=#E9E9E9
| 310 Margarita || — ||  || May 16, 1891 || Nice || A. Charlois || — || align=right | 34 km || 
|-id=311 bgcolor=#d6d6d6
| 311 Claudia || — ||  || June 11, 1891 || Nice || A. Charlois || KOR || align=right | 26 km || 
|-id=312 bgcolor=#E9E9E9
| 312 Pierretta || — ||  || August 28, 1891 || Nice || A. Charlois || — || align=right | 46 km || 
|-id=313 bgcolor=#fefefe
| 313 Chaldaea || — ||  || August 30, 1891 || Vienna || J. Palisa || CHL || align=right | 71 km || 
|-id=314 bgcolor=#d6d6d6
| 314 Rosalia || — ||  || September 1, 1891 || Nice || A. Charlois || — || align=right | 61 km || 
|-id=315 bgcolor=#fefefe
| 315 Constantia || — ||  || September 4, 1891 || Vienna || J. Palisa || — || align=right | 6.5 km || 
|-id=316 bgcolor=#d6d6d6
| 316 Goberta || — ||  || September 8, 1891 || Nice || A. Charlois || THM || align=right | 56 km || 
|-id=317 bgcolor=#fefefe
| 317 Roxane || — ||  || September 11, 1891 || Nice || A. Charlois || moon || align=right | 19 km || 
|-id=318 bgcolor=#d6d6d6
| 318 Magdalena || — ||  || September 24, 1891 || Nice || A. Charlois || — || align=right | 85 km || 
|-id=319 bgcolor=#d6d6d6
| 319 Leona || — ||  || October 8, 1891 || Nice || A. Charlois || 7:4slow || align=right | 50 km || 
|-id=320 bgcolor=#d6d6d6
| 320 Katharina || — ||  || October 11, 1891 || Vienna || J. Palisa || EOS || align=right | 23 km || 
|-id=321 bgcolor=#d6d6d6
| 321 Florentina || — ||  || October 15, 1891 || Vienna || J. Palisa || KOR || align=right | 28 km || 
|-id=322 bgcolor=#E9E9E9
| 322 Phaeo || — ||  || November 27, 1891 || Marseilles || A. Borrelly || PAE || align=right | 70 km || 
|-id=323 bgcolor=#fefefe
| 323 Brucia || — ||  || December 22, 1891 || Heidelberg || M. F. Wolf || PHO || align=right | 28 km || 
|-id=324 bgcolor=#E9E9E9
| 324 Bamberga || — ||  || February 25, 1892 || Vienna || J. Palisa || — || align=right | 221 km || 
|-id=325 bgcolor=#d6d6d6
| 325 Heidelberga || — ||  || March 4, 1892 || Heidelberg || M. F. Wolf || — || align=right | 76 km || 
|-id=326 bgcolor=#fefefe
| 326 Tamara || — ||  || March 19, 1892 || Vienna || J. Palisa || PHO || align=right | 93 km || 
|-id=327 bgcolor=#E9E9E9
| 327 Columbia || — ||  || March 22, 1892 || Nice || A. Charlois || — || align=right | 30 km || 
|-id=328 bgcolor=#d6d6d6
| 328 Gudrun || — ||  || March 18, 1892 || Heidelberg || M. F. Wolf || — || align=right | 146 km || 
|-id=329 bgcolor=#fefefe
| 329 Svea || — ||  || March 21, 1892 || Heidelberg || M. F. Wolf || SVE || align=right | 81 km || 
|-id=330 bgcolor=#fefefe
| 330 Adalberta || A910 CB ||  || February 2, 1910 || Heidelberg || M. F. Wolf || — || align=right | 9.1 km || 
|-id=331 bgcolor=#d6d6d6
| 331 Etheridgea || — ||  || April 1, 1892 || Nice || A. Charlois || — || align=right | 75 km || 
|-id=332 bgcolor=#E9E9E9
| 332 Siri || — ||  || March 19, 1892 || Heidelberg || M. F. Wolf || — || align=right | 40 km || 
|-id=333 bgcolor=#d6d6d6
| 333 Badenia || 1892 A ||  || August 22, 1892 || Heidelberg || M. F. Wolf || — || align=right | 72 km || 
|-id=334 bgcolor=#d6d6d6
| 334 Chicago || 1892 L ||  || August 23, 1892 || Heidelberg || M. F. Wolf || 3:2 || align=right | 199 km || 
|-id=335 bgcolor=#fefefe
| 335 Roberta || 1892 C ||  || September 1, 1892 || Heidelberg || A. Staus || — || align=right | 97 km || 
|-id=336 bgcolor=#fefefe
| 336 Lacadiera || 1892 D ||  || September 19, 1892 || Nice || A. Charlois || — || align=right | 63 km || 
|-id=337 bgcolor=#fefefe
| 337 Devosa || 1892 E ||  || September 22, 1892 || Nice || A. Charlois || — || align=right | 65 km || 
|-id=338 bgcolor=#d6d6d6
| 338 Budrosa || 1892 F ||  || September 25, 1892 || Nice || A. Charlois || — || align=right | 51 km || 
|-id=339 bgcolor=#d6d6d6
| 339 Dorothea || 1892 G ||  || September 25, 1892 || Heidelberg || M. F. Wolf || EOS || align=right | 44 km || 
|-id=340 bgcolor=#E9E9E9
| 340 Eduarda || 1892 H ||  || September 25, 1892 || Heidelberg || M. F. Wolf || — || align=right | 28 km || 
|-id=341 bgcolor=#fefefe
| 341 California || 1892 J ||  || September 25, 1892 || Heidelberg || M. F. Wolf || FLOslow || align=right | 16 km || 
|-id=342 bgcolor=#E9E9E9
| 342 Endymion || 1892 K ||  || October 17, 1892 || Heidelberg || M. F. Wolf || KON || align=right | 64 km || 
|-id=343 bgcolor=#fefefe
| 343 Ostara || 1892 N ||  || November 15, 1892 || Heidelberg || M. F. Wolf || slow || align=right | 18 km || 
|-id=344 bgcolor=#E9E9E9
| 344 Desiderata || 1892 M ||  || November 15, 1892 || Nice || A. Charlois || — || align=right | 124 km || 
|-id=345 bgcolor=#fefefe
| 345 Tercidina || 1892 O ||  || November 23, 1892 || Nice || A. Charlois || — || align=right | 90 km || 
|-id=346 bgcolor=#E9E9E9
| 346 Hermentaria || 1892 P ||  || November 25, 1892 || Nice || A. Charlois || — || align=right | 86 km || 
|-id=347 bgcolor=#E9E9E9
| 347 Pariana || 1892 Q ||  || November 28, 1892 || Nice || A. Charlois || — || align=right | 49 km || 
|-id=348 bgcolor=#d6d6d6
| 348 May || 1892 R ||  || November 28, 1892 || Nice || A. Charlois || — || align=right | 83 km || 
|-id=349 bgcolor=#d6d6d6
| 349 Dembowska || 1892 T ||  || December 9, 1892 || Nice || A. Charlois || — || align=right | 140 km || 
|-id=350 bgcolor=#d6d6d6
| 350 Ornamenta || 1892 U ||  || December 14, 1892 || Nice || A. Charlois || — || align=right | 129 km || 
|-id=351 bgcolor=#E9E9E9
| 351 Yrsa || 1892 V ||  || December 16, 1892 || Heidelberg || M. F. Wolf || — || align=right | 40 km || 
|-id=352 bgcolor=#fefefe
| 352 Gisela || 1893 B ||  || January 12, 1893 || Heidelberg || M. F. Wolf || FLO || align=right | 27 km || 
|-id=353 bgcolor=#E9E9E9
| 353 Ruperto-Carola || 1893 F ||  || January 16, 1893 || Heidelberg || M. F. Wolf || — || align=right | 14 km || 
|-id=354 bgcolor=#E9E9E9
| 354 Eleonora || 1893 A ||  || January 17, 1893 || Nice || A. Charlois || — || align=right | 149 km || 
|-id=355 bgcolor=#E9E9E9
| 355 Gabriella || 1893 E ||  || January 20, 1893 || Nice || A. Charlois || — || align=right | 24 km || 
|-id=356 bgcolor=#E9E9E9
| 356 Liguria || 1893 G ||  || January 21, 1893 || Nice || A. Charlois || — || align=right | 146 km || 
|-id=357 bgcolor=#d6d6d6
| 357 Ninina || 1893 J ||  || February 11, 1893 || Nice || A. Charlois || — || align=right | 124 km || 
|-id=358 bgcolor=#d6d6d6
| 358 Apollonia || 1893 K ||  || March 8, 1893 || Nice || A. Charlois || — || align=right | 90 km || 
|-id=359 bgcolor=#E9E9E9
| 359 Georgia || 1893 M ||  || March 10, 1893 || Nice || A. Charlois || — || align=right | 44 km || 
|-id=360 bgcolor=#d6d6d6
| 360 Carlova || 1893 N ||  || March 11, 1893 || Nice || A. Charlois || — || align=right | 129 km || 
|-id=361 bgcolor=#d6d6d6
| 361 Bononia || 1893 P ||  || March 11, 1893 || Nice || A. Charlois || 3:2 || align=right | 154 km || 
|-id=362 bgcolor=#E9E9E9
| 362 Havnia || 1893 R ||  || March 12, 1893 || Nice || A. Charlois || — || align=right | 98 km || 
|-id=363 bgcolor=#E9E9E9
| 363 Padua || 1893 S ||  || March 17, 1893 || Nice || A. Charlois || PAD || align=right | 97 km || 
|-id=364 bgcolor=#fefefe
| 364 Isara || 1893 T ||  || March 19, 1893 || Nice || A. Charlois || FLO || align=right | 26 km || 
|-id=365 bgcolor=#E9E9E9
| 365 Corduba || 1893 V ||  || March 21, 1893 || Nice || A. Charlois || — || align=right | 87 km || 
|-id=366 bgcolor=#d6d6d6
| 366 Vincentina || 1893 W ||  || March 21, 1893 || Nice || A. Charlois || — || align=right | 86 km || 
|-id=367 bgcolor=#fefefe
| 367 Amicitia || 1893 AA ||  || May 19, 1893 || Nice || A. Charlois || — || align=right | 21 km || 
|-id=368 bgcolor=#d6d6d6
| 368 Haidea || 1893 AB ||  || May 19, 1893 || Nice || A. Charlois || — || align=right | 69 km || 
|-id=369 bgcolor=#E9E9E9
| 369 Aëria || 1893 AE ||  || July 4, 1893 || Marseilles || A. Borrelly || AER || align=right | 74 km || 
|-id=370 bgcolor=#fefefe
| 370 Modestia || 1893 AC ||  || July 14, 1893 || Nice || A. Charlois || — || align=right | 38 km || 
|-id=371 bgcolor=#E9E9E9
| 371 Bohemia || 1893 AD ||  || July 16, 1893 || Nice || A. Charlois || — || align=right | 53 km || 
|-id=372 bgcolor=#d6d6d6
| 372 Palma || 1893 AH ||  || August 19, 1893 || Nice || A. Charlois || — || align=right | 174 km || 
|-id=373 bgcolor=#d6d6d6
| 373 Melusina || 1893 AJ ||  || September 15, 1893 || Nice || A. Charlois || — || align=right | 99 km || 
|-id=374 bgcolor=#E9E9E9
| 374 Burgundia || 1893 AK ||  || September 18, 1893 || Nice || A. Charlois || — || align=right | 45 km || 
|-id=375 bgcolor=#d6d6d6
| 375 Ursula || 1893 AL ||  || September 18, 1893 || Nice || A. Charlois || URS || align=right | 216 km || 
|-id=376 bgcolor=#fefefe
| 376 Geometria || 1893 AM ||  || September 18, 1893 || Nice || A. Charlois || — || align=right | 35 km || 
|-id=377 bgcolor=#E9E9E9
| 377 Campania || 1893 AN ||  || September 20, 1893 || Nice || A. Charlois || — || align=right | 90 km || 
|-id=378 bgcolor=#E9E9E9
| 378 Holmia || 1893 AP ||  || December 6, 1893 || Nice || A. Charlois || — || align=right | 28 km || 
|-id=379 bgcolor=#d6d6d6
| 379 Huenna || 1894 AQ ||  || January 8, 1894 || Nice || A. Charlois || THMmoon || align=right | 85 km || 
|-id=380 bgcolor=#E9E9E9
| 380 Fiducia || 1894 AR ||  || January 8, 1894 || Nice || A. Charlois || — || align=right | 68 km || 
|-id=381 bgcolor=#d6d6d6
| 381 Myrrha || 1894 AS ||  || January 10, 1894 || Nice || A. Charlois || — || align=right | 128 km || 
|-id=382 bgcolor=#d6d6d6
| 382 Dodona || 1894 AT ||  || January 29, 1894 || Nice || A. Charlois || — || align=right | 65 km || 
|-id=383 bgcolor=#d6d6d6
| 383 Janina || 1894 AU ||  || January 29, 1894 || Nice || A. Charlois || THM || align=right | 43 km || 
|-id=384 bgcolor=#E9E9E9
| 384 Burdigala || 1894 AV ||  || February 11, 1894 || Bordeaux || F. Courty || — || align=right | 34 km || 
|-id=385 bgcolor=#d6d6d6
| 385 Ilmatar || 1894 AX ||  || March 1, 1894 || Heidelberg || M. F. Wolf || — || align=right | 86 km || 
|-id=386 bgcolor=#d6d6d6
| 386 Siegena || 1894 AY ||  || March 1, 1894 || Heidelberg || M. F. Wolf || — || align=right | 165 km || 
|-id=387 bgcolor=#E9E9E9
| 387 Aquitania || 1894 AZ ||  || March 5, 1894 || Bordeaux || F. Courty || POS || align=right | 101 km || 
|-id=388 bgcolor=#d6d6d6
| 388 Charybdis || 1894 BA ||  || March 7, 1894 || Nice || A. Charlois || — || align=right | 126 km || 
|-id=389 bgcolor=#E9E9E9
| 389 Industria || 1894 BB ||  || March 8, 1894 || Nice || A. Charlois || — || align=right | 74 km || 
|-id=390 bgcolor=#E9E9E9
| 390 Alma || 1894 BC ||  || March 24, 1894 || Paris || G. Bigourdan || — || align=right | 26 km || 
|-id=391 bgcolor=#FA8072
| 391 Ingeborg || 1894 BE ||  || November 1, 1894 || Heidelberg || M. F. Wolf || — || align=right | 16 km || 
|-id=392 bgcolor=#d6d6d6
| 392 Wilhelmina || 1894 BF ||  || November 4, 1894 || Heidelberg || M. F. Wolf || — || align=right | 61 km || 
|-id=393 bgcolor=#E9E9E9
| 393 Lampetia || 1894 BG ||  || November 4, 1894 || Heidelberg || M. F. Wolf || — || align=right | 116 km || 
|-id=394 bgcolor=#E9E9E9
| 394 Arduina || 1894 BH ||  || November 19, 1894 || Marseilles || A. Borrelly || — || align=right | 30 km || 
|-id=395 bgcolor=#E9E9E9
| 395 Delia || 1894 BK ||  || November 30, 1894 || Nice || A. Charlois || — || align=right | 44 km || 
|-id=396 bgcolor=#E9E9E9
| 396 Aeolia || 1894 BL ||  || December 1, 1894 || Nice || A. Charlois || AEO || align=right | 39 km || 
|-id=397 bgcolor=#E9E9E9
| 397 Vienna || 1894 BM ||  || December 19, 1894 || Nice || A. Charlois || — || align=right | 49 km || 
|-id=398 bgcolor=#E9E9E9
| 398 Admete || 1894 BN ||  || December 28, 1894 || Nice || A. Charlois || — || align=right | 50 km || 
|-id=399 bgcolor=#d6d6d6
| 399 Persephone || 1895 BP ||  || February 23, 1895 || Heidelberg || M. F. Wolf || — || align=right | 40 km || 
|-id=400 bgcolor=#d6d6d6
| 400 Ducrosa || 1895 BU ||  || March 15, 1895 || Nice || A. Charlois || — || align=right | 36 km || 
|}

401–500 

|-bgcolor=#d6d6d6
| 401 Ottilia || 1895 BT ||  || March 16, 1895 || Heidelberg || M. F. Wolf || 7:4 || align=right | 88 km || 
|-id=402 bgcolor=#E9E9E9
| 402 Chloë || 1895 BW ||  || March 21, 1895 || Nice || A. Charlois || — || align=right | 55 km || 
|-id=403 bgcolor=#E9E9E9
| 403 Cyane || 1895 BX ||  || May 18, 1895 || Nice || A. Charlois || — || align=right | 54 km || 
|-id=404 bgcolor=#E9E9E9
| 404 Arsinoë || 1895 BY ||  || June 20, 1895 || Nice || A. Charlois || MIT || align=right | 95 km || 
|-id=405 bgcolor=#E9E9E9
| 405 Thia || 1895 BZ ||  || July 23, 1895 || Nice || A. Charlois || — || align=right | 109 km || 
|-id=406 bgcolor=#d6d6d6
| 406 Erna || 1895 CB ||  || August 22, 1895 || Nice || A. Charlois || — || align=right | 46 km || 
|-id=407 bgcolor=#E9E9E9
| 407 Arachne || 1895 CC ||  || October 13, 1895 || Heidelberg || M. F. Wolf || — || align=right | 95 km || 
|-id=408 bgcolor=#d6d6d6
| 408 Fama || 1895 CD ||  || October 13, 1895 || Heidelberg || M. F. Wolf || slow || align=right | 36 km || 
|-id=409 bgcolor=#E9E9E9
| 409 Aspasia || 1895 CE ||  || December 9, 1895 || Nice || A. Charlois || — || align=right | 171 km || 
|-id=410 bgcolor=#E9E9E9
| 410 Chloris || 1896 CH ||  || January 7, 1896 || Nice || A. Charlois || CLO || align=right | 119 km || 
|-id=411 bgcolor=#d6d6d6
| 411 Xanthe || 1896 CJ ||  || January 7, 1896 || Nice || A. Charlois || — || align=right | 77 km || 
|-id=412 bgcolor=#E9E9E9
| 412 Elisabetha || 1896 CK ||  || January 7, 1896 || Heidelberg || M. F. Wolf || — || align=right | 96 km || 
|-id=413 bgcolor=#E9E9E9
| 413 Edburga || 1896 CL ||  || January 7, 1896 || Heidelberg || M. F. Wolf || — || align=right | 34 km || 
|-id=414 bgcolor=#d6d6d6
| 414 Liriope || 1896 CN ||  || January 16, 1896 || Nice || A. Charlois || 7:4 || align=right | 89 km || 
|-id=415 bgcolor=#E9E9E9
| 415 Palatia || 1896 CO ||  || February 7, 1896 || Heidelberg || M. F. Wolf || — || align=right | 84 km || 
|-id=416 bgcolor=#E9E9E9
| 416 Vaticana || 1896 CS ||  || May 4, 1896 || Nice || A. Charlois || — || align=right | 85 km || 
|-id=417 bgcolor=#E9E9E9
| 417 Suevia || 1896 CT ||  || May 6, 1896 || Heidelberg || M. F. Wolf || — || align=right | 55 km || 
|-id=418 bgcolor=#E9E9E9
| 418 Alemannia || 1896 CV ||  || September 7, 1896 || Heidelberg || M. F. Wolf || — || align=right | 40 km || 
|-id=419 bgcolor=#E9E9E9
| 419 Aurelia || 1896 CW ||  || September 7, 1896 || Heidelberg || M. F. Wolf || — || align=right | 149 km || 
|-id=420 bgcolor=#d6d6d6
| 420 Bertholda || 1896 CY ||  || September 7, 1896 || Heidelberg || M. F. Wolf || 7:4 || align=right | 139 km || 
|-id=421 bgcolor=#E9E9E9
| 421 Zähringia || 1896 CZ ||  || September 7, 1896 || Heidelberg || M. F. Wolf || — || align=right | 14 km || 
|-id=422 bgcolor=#fefefe
| 422 Berolina || 1896 DA ||  || October 8, 1896 || Urania || G. Witt || — || align=right | 11 km || 
|-id=423 bgcolor=#d6d6d6
| 423 Diotima || 1896 DB ||  || December 7, 1896 || Nice || A. Charlois || — || align=right | 176 km || 
|-id=424 bgcolor=#E9E9E9
| 424 Gratia || 1896 DF ||  || December 31, 1896 || Nice || A. Charlois || — || align=right | 103 km || 
|-id=425 bgcolor=#d6d6d6
| 425 Cornelia || 1896 DC ||  || December 28, 1896 || Nice || A. Charlois || — || align=right | 68 km || 
|-id=426 bgcolor=#d6d6d6
| 426 Hippo || 1897 DH ||  || August 25, 1897 || Nice || A. Charlois || — || align=right | 138 km || 
|-id=427 bgcolor=#d6d6d6
| 427 Galene || 1897 DJ ||  || August 27, 1897 || Nice || A. Charlois || — || align=right | 32 km || 
|-id=428 bgcolor=#fefefe
| 428 Monachia || 1897 DK ||  || November 18, 1897 || Munich || W. Villiger || FLO || align=right | 20 km || 
|-id=429 bgcolor=#E9E9E9
| 429 Lotis || 1897 DL ||  || November 23, 1897 || Nice || A. Charlois || — || align=right | 70 km || 
|-id=430 bgcolor=#d6d6d6
| 430 Hybris || 1897 DM ||  || December 18, 1897 || Nice || A. Charlois || — || align=right | 32 km || 
|-id=431 bgcolor=#d6d6d6
| 431 Nephele || 1897 DN ||  || December 18, 1897 || Nice || A. Charlois || — || align=right | 102 km || 
|-id=432 bgcolor=#fefefe
| 432 Pythia || 1897 DO ||  || December 18, 1897 || Nice || A. Charlois || — || align=right | 47 km || 
|-id=433 bgcolor=#FFC2E0
| 433 Eros || 1898 DQ ||  || August 13, 1898 || Urania || G. Witt || AMO +1km || align=right | 17 km || 
|-id=434 bgcolor=#fefefe
| 434 Hungaria || 1898 DR ||  || September 11, 1898 || Heidelberg || M. F. Wolf || H || align=right | 8.9 km || 
|-id=435 bgcolor=#fefefe
| 435 Ella || 1898 DS ||  || September 11, 1898 || Heidelberg || M. F. Wolf, A. Schwassmann || — || align=right | 35 km || 
|-id=436 bgcolor=#d6d6d6
| 436 Patricia || 1898 DT ||  || September 13, 1898 || Heidelberg || M. F. Wolf, A. Schwassmann || — || align=right | 59 km || 
|-id=437 bgcolor=#fefefe
| 437 Rhodia || 1898 DP ||  || July 16, 1898 || Nice || A. Charlois || slow || align=right | 13 km || 
|-id=438 bgcolor=#E9E9E9
| 438 Zeuxo || 1898 DU ||  || November 8, 1898 || Nice || A. Charlois || — || align=right | 59 km || 
|-id=439 bgcolor=#d6d6d6
| 439 Ohio || 1898 EB ||  || October 13, 1898 || Mount Hamilton || E. F. Coddington || — || align=right | 70 km || 
|-id=440 bgcolor=#fefefe
| 440 Theodora || 1898 EC ||  || October 13, 1898 || Mount Hamilton || E. F. Coddington || — || align=right | 14 km || 
|-id=441 bgcolor=#E9E9E9
| 441 Bathilde || 1898 ED ||  || December 8, 1898 || Nice || A. Charlois || — || align=right | 65 km || 
|-id=442 bgcolor=#fefefe
| 442 Eichsfeldia || 1899 EE ||  || February 15, 1899 || Heidelberg || M. F. Wolf, A. Schwassmann || — || align=right | 62 km || 
|-id=443 bgcolor=#fefefe
| 443 Photographica || 1899 EF ||  || February 17, 1899 || Heidelberg || M. F. Wolf, A. Schwassmann || — || align=right | 26 km || 
|-id=444 bgcolor=#E9E9E9
| 444 Gyptis || 1899 EL ||  || March 31, 1899 || Marseilles || J. Coggia || — || align=right | 159 km || 
|-id=445 bgcolor=#d6d6d6
| 445 Edna || 1899 EX ||  || October 2, 1899 || Mount Hamilton || E. F. Coddington || — || align=right | 88 km || 
|-id=446 bgcolor=#E9E9E9
| 446 Aeternitas || 1899 ER ||  || October 27, 1899 || Heidelberg || M. F. Wolf, A. Schwassmann || — || align=right | 54 km || 
|-id=447 bgcolor=#d6d6d6
| 447 Valentine || 1899 ES ||  || October 27, 1899 || Heidelberg || M. F. Wolf, A. Schwassmann || — || align=right | 85 km || 
|-id=448 bgcolor=#d6d6d6
| 448 Natalie || 1899 ET ||  || October 27, 1899 || Heidelberg || M. F. Wolf, A. Schwassmann || — || align=right | 51 km || 
|-id=449 bgcolor=#E9E9E9
| 449 Hamburga || 1899 EU ||  || October 31, 1899 || Heidelberg || M. F. Wolf, A. Schwassmann || — || align=right | 86 km || 
|-id=450 bgcolor=#d6d6d6
| 450 Brigitta || 1899 EV ||  || October 10, 1899 || Heidelberg || M. F. Wolf, A. Schwassmann || EOS || align=right | 37 km || 
|-id=451 bgcolor=#d6d6d6
| 451 Patientia || 1899 EY ||  || December 4, 1899 || Nice || A. Charlois || — || align=right | 254 km || 
|-id=452 bgcolor=#d6d6d6
| 452 Hamiltonia || 1899 FD ||  || December 6, 1899 || Mount Hamilton || J. E. Keeler || KOR || align=right | 12 km || 
|-id=453 bgcolor=#fefefe
| 453 Tea || 1900 FA ||  || February 22, 1900 || Nice || A. Charlois || FLO || align=right | 24 km || 
|-id=454 bgcolor=#E9E9E9
| 454 Mathesis || 1900 FC ||  || March 28, 1900 || Heidelberg || A. Schwassmann || — || align=right | 82 km || 
|-id=455 bgcolor=#E9E9E9
| 455 Bruchsalia || 1900 FG ||  || May 22, 1900 || Heidelberg || M. F. Wolf, A. Schwassmann || — || align=right | 89 km || 
|-id=456 bgcolor=#E9E9E9
| 456 Abnoba || 1900 FH ||  || June 4, 1900 || Heidelberg || M. F. Wolf, A. Schwassmann || — || align=right | 38 km || 
|-id=457 bgcolor=#d6d6d6
| 457 Alleghenia || 1900 FJ ||  || September 15, 1900 || Heidelberg || M. F. Wolf, A. Schwassmann || — || align=right | 19 km || 
|-id=458 bgcolor=#d6d6d6
| 458 Hercynia || 1900 FK ||  || September 21, 1900 || Heidelberg || M. F. Wolf, A. Schwassmann || — || align=right | 37 km || 
|-id=459 bgcolor=#E9E9E9
| 459 Signe || 1900 FM ||  || October 22, 1900 || Heidelberg || M. F. Wolf || — || align=right | 26 km || 
|-id=460 bgcolor=#E9E9E9
| 460 Scania || 1900 FN ||  || October 22, 1900 || Heidelberg || M. F. Wolf || slow || align=right | 20 km || 
|-id=461 bgcolor=#d6d6d6
| 461 Saskia || 1900 FP ||  || October 22, 1900 || Heidelberg || M. F. Wolf || THM || align=right | 44 km || 
|-id=462 bgcolor=#d6d6d6
| 462 Eriphyla || 1900 FQ ||  || October 22, 1900 || Heidelberg || M. F. Wolf || KOR || align=right | 34 km || 
|-id=463 bgcolor=#fefefe
| 463 Lola || 1900 FS ||  || October 31, 1900 || Heidelberg || M. F. Wolf || — || align=right | 21 km || 
|-id=464 bgcolor=#E9E9E9
| 464 Megaira || 1901 FV ||  || January 9, 1901 || Heidelberg || M. F. Wolf || — || align=right | 77 km || 
|-id=465 bgcolor=#d6d6d6
| 465 Alekto || 1901 FW ||  || January 13, 1901 || Heidelberg || M. F. Wolf || — || align=right | 73 km || 
|-id=466 bgcolor=#d6d6d6
| 466 Tisiphone || 1901 FX ||  || January 17, 1901 || Heidelberg || M. F. Wolf, L. Carnera || 7:4 || align=right | 95 km || 
|-id=467 bgcolor=#d6d6d6
| 467 Laura || 1901 FY ||  || January 9, 1901 || Heidelberg || M. F. Wolf || — || align=right | 39 km || 
|-id=468 bgcolor=#d6d6d6
| 468 Lina || 1901 FZ ||  || January 18, 1901 || Heidelberg || M. F. Wolf || THM || align=right | 60 km || 
|-id=469 bgcolor=#d6d6d6
| 469 Argentina || 1901 GE ||  || February 20, 1901 || Heidelberg || L. Carnera || — || align=right | 134 km || 
|-id=470 bgcolor=#fefefe
| 470 Kilia || 1901 GJ ||  || April 21, 1901 || Heidelberg || L. Carnera || slow || align=right | 28 km || 
|-id=471 bgcolor=#d6d6d6
| 471 Papagena || 1901 GN ||  || June 7, 1901 || Heidelberg || M. F. Wolf || — || align=right | 148 km || 
|-id=472 bgcolor=#E9E9E9
| 472 Roma || 1901 GP ||  || July 11, 1901 || Heidelberg || L. Carnera || MAR || align=right | 50 km || 
|-id=473 bgcolor=#E9E9E9
| 473 Nolli || 1901 GC ||  || February 13, 1901 || Heidelberg || M. F. Wolf || EUN || align=right | 12 km || 
|-id=474 bgcolor=#fefefe
| 474 Prudentia || 1901 GD ||  || February 13, 1901 || Heidelberg || M. F. Wolf || — || align=right | 41 km || 
|-id=475 bgcolor=#FA8072
| 475 Ocllo || 1901 HN ||  || August 14, 1901 || Arequipa || D. Stewart || — || align=right | 18 km || 
|-id=476 bgcolor=#E9E9E9
| 476 Hedwig || 1901 GQ ||  || August 17, 1901 || Heidelberg || L. Carnera || — || align=right | 138 km || 
|-id=477 bgcolor=#fefefe
| 477 Italia || 1901 GR ||  || August 23, 1901 || Heidelberg || L. Carnera || — || align=right | 23 km || 
|-id=478 bgcolor=#d6d6d6
| 478 Tergeste || 1901 GU ||  || September 21, 1901 || Heidelberg || L. Carnera || — || align=right | 81 km || 
|-id=479 bgcolor=#E9E9E9
| 479 Caprera || 1901 HJ ||  || November 12, 1901 || Heidelberg || L. Carnera || — || align=right | 60 km || 
|-id=480 bgcolor=#E9E9E9
| 480 Hansa || 1901 GL ||  || May 21, 1901 || Heidelberg || M. F. Wolf, L. Carnera || HNS || align=right | 56 km || 
|-id=481 bgcolor=#E9E9E9
| 481 Emita || 1902 HP ||  || February 12, 1902 || Heidelberg || L. Carnera || — || align=right | 102 km || 
|-id=482 bgcolor=#d6d6d6
| 482 Petrina || 1902 HT ||  || March 3, 1902 || Heidelberg || M. F. Wolf || — || align=right | 46 km || 
|-id=483 bgcolor=#d6d6d6
| 483 Seppina || 1902 HU ||  || March 4, 1902 || Heidelberg || M. F. Wolf || 7:4 || align=right | 67 km || 
|-id=484 bgcolor=#E9E9E9
| 484 Pittsburghia || 1902 HX ||  || April 29, 1902 || Heidelberg || M. F. Wolf || — || align=right | 30 km || 
|-id=485 bgcolor=#E9E9E9
| 485 Genua || 1902 HZ ||  || May 7, 1902 || Heidelberg || L. Carnera || — || align=right | 64 km || 
|-id=486 bgcolor=#fefefe
| 486 Cremona || 1902 JB ||  || May 11, 1902 || Heidelberg || L. Carnera || — || align=right | 23 km || 
|-id=487 bgcolor=#E9E9E9
| 487 Venetia || 1902 JL ||  || July 9, 1902 || Heidelberg || L. Carnera || — || align=right | 59 km || 
|-id=488 bgcolor=#d6d6d6
| 488 Kreusa || 1902 JG ||  || June 26, 1902 || Heidelberg || M. F. Wolf, L. Carnera || — || align=right | 168 km || 
|-id=489 bgcolor=#d6d6d6
| 489 Comacina || 1902 JM ||  || September 2, 1902 || Heidelberg || L. Carnera || — || align=right | 139 km || 
|-id=490 bgcolor=#d6d6d6
| 490 Veritas || 1902 JP ||  || September 3, 1902 || Heidelberg || M. F. Wolf || VER || align=right | 119 km || 
|-id=491 bgcolor=#d6d6d6
| 491 Carina || 1902 JQ ||  || September 3, 1902 || Heidelberg || M. F. Wolf || — || align=right | 91 km || 
|-id=492 bgcolor=#d6d6d6
| 492 Gismonda || 1902 JR ||  || September 3, 1902 || Heidelberg || M. F. Wolf || THM || align=right | 53 km || 
|-id=493 bgcolor=#d6d6d6
| 493 Griseldis || 1902 JS ||  || September 7, 1902 || Heidelberg || M. F. Wolf || — || align=right | 42 km || 
|-id=494 bgcolor=#d6d6d6
| 494 Virtus || 1902 JV ||  || October 7, 1902 || Heidelberg || M. F. Wolf || — || align=right | 101 km || 
|-id=495 bgcolor=#fefefe
| 495 Eulalia || 1902 KG ||  || October 25, 1902 || Heidelberg || M. F. Wolf || — || align=right | 37 km || 
|-id=496 bgcolor=#fefefe
| 496 Gryphia || 1902 KH ||  || October 25, 1902 || Heidelberg || M. F. Wolf || FLOslow || align=right | 14 km || 
|-id=497 bgcolor=#d6d6d6
| 497 Iva || 1902 KJ ||  || November 4, 1902 || Heidelberg || R. S. Dugan || — || align=right | 41 km || 
|-id=498 bgcolor=#E9E9E9
| 498 Tokio || 1902 KU ||  || December 2, 1902 || Nice || A. Charlois || — || align=right | 82 km || 
|-id=499 bgcolor=#d6d6d6
| 499 Venusia || 1902 KX ||  || December 24, 1902 || Heidelberg || M. F. Wolf || 3:2 || align=right | 77 km || 
|-id=500 bgcolor=#E9E9E9
| 500 Selinur || 1903 LA ||  || January 16, 1903 || Heidelberg || M. F. Wolf || — || align=right | 41 km || 
|}

501–600 

|-bgcolor=#d6d6d6
| 501 Urhixidur || 1903 LB ||  || January 18, 1903 || Heidelberg || M. F. Wolf || — || align=right | 74 km || 
|-id=502 bgcolor=#fefefe
| 502 Sigune || 1903 LC ||  || January 19, 1903 || Heidelberg || M. F. Wolf || PHO || align=right | 16 km || 
|-id=503 bgcolor=#E9E9E9
| 503 Evelyn || 1903 LF ||  || January 19, 1903 || Heidelberg || R. S. Dugan || — || align=right | 82 km || 
|-id=504 bgcolor=#E9E9E9
| 504 Cora || 1902 LK ||  || June 30, 1902 || Arequipa || S. I. Bailey || — || align=right | 30 km || 
|-id=505 bgcolor=#E9E9E9
| 505 Cava || 1902 LL ||  || August 21, 1902 || Arequipa || R. H. Frost || — || align=right | 115 km || 
|-id=506 bgcolor=#d6d6d6
| 506 Marion || 1903 LN ||  || February 17, 1903 || Heidelberg || R. S. Dugan || — || align=right | 106 km || 
|-id=507 bgcolor=#d6d6d6
| 507 Laodica || 1903 LO ||  || February 19, 1903 || Heidelberg || R. S. Dugan || — || align=right | 45 km || 
|-id=508 bgcolor=#d6d6d6
| 508 Princetonia || 1903 LQ ||  || April 20, 1903 || Heidelberg || R. S. Dugan || — || align=right | 117 km || 
|-id=509 bgcolor=#d6d6d6
| 509 Iolanda || 1903 LR ||  || April 28, 1903 || Heidelberg || M. F. Wolf || — || align=right | 52 km || 
|-id=510 bgcolor=#E9E9E9
| 510 Mabella || 1903 LT ||  || May 20, 1903 || Heidelberg || R. S. Dugan || — || align=right | 60 km || 
|-id=511 bgcolor=#d6d6d6
| 511 Davida || 1903 LU ||  || May 30, 1903 || Heidelberg || R. S. Dugan || MEL || align=right | 270 km || 
|-id=512 bgcolor=#FA8072
| 512 Taurinensis || 1903 LV ||  || June 23, 1903 || Heidelberg || M. F. Wolf || — || align=right | 23 km || 
|-id=513 bgcolor=#d6d6d6
| 513 Centesima || 1903 LY ||  || August 24, 1903 || Heidelberg || M. F. Wolf || EOS || align=right | 49 km || 
|-id=514 bgcolor=#d6d6d6
| 514 Armida || 1903 MB ||  || August 24, 1903 || Heidelberg || M. F. Wolf || — || align=right | 120 km || 
|-id=515 bgcolor=#d6d6d6
| 515 Athalia || 1903 ME ||  || September 20, 1903 || Heidelberg || M. F. Wolf || THM || align=right | 41 km || 
|-id=516 bgcolor=#E9E9E9
| 516 Amherstia || 1903 MG ||  || September 20, 1903 || Heidelberg || R. S. Dugan || — || align=right | 65 km || 
|-id=517 bgcolor=#d6d6d6
| 517 Edith || 1903 MH ||  || September 22, 1903 || Heidelberg || R. S. Dugan || — || align=right | 112 km || 
|-id=518 bgcolor=#E9E9E9
| 518 Halawe || 1903 MO ||  || October 20, 1903 || Heidelberg || R. S. Dugan || — || align=right | 16 km || 
|-id=519 bgcolor=#E9E9E9
| 519 Sylvania || 1903 MP ||  || October 20, 1903 || Heidelberg || R. S. Dugan || — || align=right | 40 km || 
|-id=520 bgcolor=#d6d6d6
| 520 Franziska || 1903 MV ||  || October 27, 1903 || Heidelberg || M. F. Wolf, P. Götz || EOS || align=right | 25 km || 
|-id=521 bgcolor=#E9E9E9
| 521 Brixia || 1904 NB ||  || January 10, 1904 || Heidelberg || R. S. Dugan || — || align=right | 107 km || 
|-id=522 bgcolor=#d6d6d6
| 522 Helga || 1904 NC ||  || January 10, 1904 || Heidelberg || M. F. Wolf || 7:4 || align=right | 101 km || 
|-id=523 bgcolor=#d6d6d6
| 523 Ada || 1904 ND ||  || January 27, 1904 || Heidelberg || R. S. Dugan || — || align=right | 32 km || 
|-id=524 bgcolor=#E9E9E9
| 524 Fidelio || 1904 NN ||  || March 14, 1904 || Heidelberg || M. F. Wolf || — || align=right | 66 km || 
|-id=525 bgcolor=#fefefe
| 525 Adelaide ||  ||  || October 21, 1908 || Taunton || J. H. Metcalf || FLO || align=right | 9.3 km || 
|-id=526 bgcolor=#d6d6d6
| 526 Jena || 1904 NQ ||  || March 14, 1904 || Heidelberg || M. F. Wolf || THM || align=right | 45 km || 
|-id=527 bgcolor=#E9E9E9
| 527 Euryanthe || 1904 NR ||  || March 20, 1904 || Heidelberg || M. F. Wolf || — || align=right | 53 km || 
|-id=528 bgcolor=#d6d6d6
| 528 Rezia || 1904 NS ||  || March 20, 1904 || Heidelberg || M. F. Wolf || 7:4 || align=right | 92 km || 
|-id=529 bgcolor=#d6d6d6
| 529 Preziosa || 1904 NT ||  || March 20, 1904 || Heidelberg || M. F. Wolf || EOS || align=right | 32 km || 
|-id=530 bgcolor=#d6d6d6
| 530 Turandot || 1904 NV ||  || April 11, 1904 || Heidelberg || M. F. Wolf || — || align=right | 85 km || 
|-id=531 bgcolor=#E9E9E9
| 531 Zerlina || 1904 NW ||  || April 12, 1904 || Heidelberg || M. F. Wolf || PAL || align=right | 18 km || 
|-id=532 bgcolor=#E9E9E9
| 532 Herculina || 1904 NY ||  || April 20, 1904 || Heidelberg || M. F. Wolf || — || align=right | 168 km || 
|-id=533 bgcolor=#d6d6d6
| 533 Sara || 1904 NZ ||  || April 19, 1904 || Heidelberg || R. S. Dugan || — || align=right | 31 km || 
|-id=534 bgcolor=#d6d6d6
| 534 Nassovia || 1904 OA ||  || April 19, 1904 || Heidelberg || R. S. Dugan || KOR || align=right | 32 km || 
|-id=535 bgcolor=#E9E9E9
| 535 Montague || 1904 OC ||  || May 7, 1904 || Heidelberg || R. S. Dugan || — || align=right | 79 km || 
|-id=536 bgcolor=#d6d6d6
| 536 Merapi || 1904 OF ||  || May 11, 1904 || Washington || G. H. Peters || 7:4 || align=right | 147 km || 
|-id=537 bgcolor=#d6d6d6
| 537 Pauly || 1904 OG ||  || July 7, 1904 || Nice || A. Charlois || — || align=right | 41 km || 
|-id=538 bgcolor=#d6d6d6
| 538 Friederike || 1904 OK ||  || July 18, 1904 || Heidelberg || P. Götz || HYG || align=right | 71 km || 
|-id=539 bgcolor=#E9E9E9
| 539 Pamina || 1904 OL ||  || August 2, 1904 || Heidelberg || M. F. Wolf || — || align=right | 68 km || 
|-id=540 bgcolor=#fefefe
| 540 Rosamunde || 1904 ON ||  || August 3, 1904 || Heidelberg || M. F. Wolf || FLO || align=right | 19 km || 
|-id=541 bgcolor=#E9E9E9
| 541 Deborah || 1904 OO ||  || August 4, 1904 || Heidelberg || M. F. Wolf || — || align=right | 60 km || 
|-id=542 bgcolor=#d6d6d6
| 542 Susanna || 1904 OQ ||  || August 15, 1904 || Heidelberg || P. Götz, A. Kopff || — || align=right | 42 km || 
|-id=543 bgcolor=#d6d6d6
| 543 Charlotte || 1904 OT ||  || September 11, 1904 || Heidelberg || P. Götz || — || align=right | 46 km || 
|-id=544 bgcolor=#E9E9E9
| 544 Jetta || 1904 OU ||  || September 11, 1904 || Heidelberg || P. Götz || — || align=right | 27 km || 
|-id=545 bgcolor=#d6d6d6
| 545 Messalina || 1904 OY ||  || October 3, 1904 || Heidelberg || P. Götz || — || align=right | 113 km || 
|-id=546 bgcolor=#E9E9E9
| 546 Herodias || 1904 PA ||  || October 10, 1904 || Heidelberg || P. Götz || — || align=right | 66 km || 
|-id=547 bgcolor=#E9E9E9
| 547 Praxedis || 1904 PB ||  || October 14, 1904 || Heidelberg || P. Götz || POS || align=right | 52 km || 
|-id=548 bgcolor=#fefefe
| 548 Kressida || 1904 PC ||  || October 14, 1904 || Heidelberg || P. Götz || — || align=right | 14 km || 
|-id=549 bgcolor=#E9E9E9
| 549 Jessonda || 1904 PK ||  || November 15, 1904 || Heidelberg || M. F. Wolf || — || align=right | 16 km || 
|-id=550 bgcolor=#E9E9E9
| 550 Senta || 1904 PL ||  || November 16, 1904 || Heidelberg || M. F. Wolf || — || align=right | 37 km || 
|-id=551 bgcolor=#d6d6d6
| 551 Ortrud || 1904 PM ||  || November 16, 1904 || Heidelberg || M. F. Wolf || — || align=right | 81 km || 
|-id=552 bgcolor=#d6d6d6
| 552 Sigelinde || 1904 PO ||  || December 14, 1904 || Heidelberg || M. F. Wolf || — || align=right | 89 km || 
|-id=553 bgcolor=#fefefe
| 553 Kundry || 1904 PP ||  || December 27, 1904 || Heidelberg || M. F. Wolf || FLO || align=right | 9.0 km || 
|-id=554 bgcolor=#fefefe
| 554 Peraga || 1905 PS ||  || January 8, 1905 || Heidelberg || P. Götz || — || align=right | 96 km || 
|-id=555 bgcolor=#d6d6d6
| 555 Norma || 1905 PT ||  || January 14, 1905 || Heidelberg || M. F. Wolf || — || align=right | 31 km || 
|-id=556 bgcolor=#fefefe
| 556 Phyllis || 1905 PW ||  || January 8, 1905 || Heidelberg || P. Götz || V || align=right | 36 km || 
|-id=557 bgcolor=#fefefe
| 557 Violetta || 1905 PY ||  || January 26, 1905 || Heidelberg || M. F. Wolf || — || align=right | 23 km || 
|-id=558 bgcolor=#d6d6d6
| 558 Carmen || 1905 QB ||  || February 9, 1905 || Heidelberg || M. F. Wolf || — || align=right | 55 km || 
|-id=559 bgcolor=#E9E9E9
| 559 Nanon || 1905 QD ||  || March 8, 1905 || Heidelberg || M. F. Wolf || — || align=right | 80 km || 
|-id=560 bgcolor=#E9E9E9
| 560 Delila || 1905 QF ||  || March 13, 1905 || Heidelberg || M. F. Wolf || — || align=right | 35 km || 
|-id=561 bgcolor=#d6d6d6
| 561 Ingwelde || 1905 QG ||  || March 26, 1905 || Heidelberg || M. F. Wolf || THM || align=right | 32 km || 
|-id=562 bgcolor=#d6d6d6
| 562 Salome || 1905 QH ||  || April 3, 1905 || Heidelberg || M. F. Wolf || EOS || align=right | 33 km || 
|-id=563 bgcolor=#E9E9E9
| 563 Suleika || 1905 QK ||  || April 6, 1905 || Heidelberg || P. Götz || — || align=right | 53 km || 
|-id=564 bgcolor=#E9E9E9
| 564 Dudu || 1905 QM ||  || May 9, 1905 || Heidelberg || P. Götz || — || align=right | 52 km || 
|-id=565 bgcolor=#fefefe
| 565 Marbachia || 1905 QN ||  || May 9, 1905 || Heidelberg || M. F. Wolf || — || align=right | 27 km || 
|-id=566 bgcolor=#d6d6d6
| 566 Stereoskopia || 1905 QO ||  || May 28, 1905 || Heidelberg || P. Götz || 7:4 || align=right | 167 km || 
|-id=567 bgcolor=#d6d6d6
| 567 Eleutheria || 1905 QP ||  || May 28, 1905 || Heidelberg || P. Götz || — || align=right | 93 km || 
|-id=568 bgcolor=#d6d6d6
| 568 Cheruskia || 1905 QS ||  || July 26, 1905 || Heidelberg || P. Götz || — || align=right | 71 km || 
|-id=569 bgcolor=#E9E9E9
| 569 Misa || 1905 QT ||  || July 27, 1905 || Vienna || J. Palisa || MIS || align=right | 73 km || 
|-id=570 bgcolor=#d6d6d6
| 570 Kythera || 1905 QX ||  || July 30, 1905 || Heidelberg || M. F. Wolf || 7:4 || align=right | 87 km || 
|-id=571 bgcolor=#fefefe
| 571 Dulcinea || 1905 QZ ||  || September 4, 1905 || Heidelberg || P. Götz || slow || align=right | 12 km || 
|-id=572 bgcolor=#fefefe
| 572 Rebekka || 1905 RB ||  || September 19, 1905 || Heidelberg || P. Götz || — || align=right | 29 km || 
|-id=573 bgcolor=#d6d6d6
| 573 Recha || 1905 RC ||  || September 19, 1905 || Heidelberg || M. F. Wolf || EOS || align=right | 48 km || 
|-id=574 bgcolor=#fefefe
| 574 Reginhild || 1905 RD ||  || September 19, 1905 || Heidelberg || M. F. Wolf || — || align=right | 8.5 km || 
|-id=575 bgcolor=#E9E9E9
| 575 Renate || 1905 RE ||  || September 19, 1905 || Heidelberg || M. F. Wolf || MAR || align=right | 19 km || 
|-id=576 bgcolor=#d6d6d6
| 576 Emanuela || 1905 RF ||  || September 22, 1905 || Heidelberg || P. Götz || — || align=right | 74 km || 
|-id=577 bgcolor=#d6d6d6
| 577 Rhea || 1905 RH ||  || October 20, 1905 || Heidelberg || M. F. Wolf || — || align=right | 38 km || 
|-id=578 bgcolor=#E9E9E9
| 578 Happelia || 1905 RZ ||  || November 1, 1905 || Heidelberg || M. F. Wolf || — || align=right | 69 km || 
|-id=579 bgcolor=#d6d6d6
| 579 Sidonia || 1905 SD ||  || November 3, 1905 || Heidelberg || A. Kopff || EOS || align=right | 86 km || 
|-id=580 bgcolor=#d6d6d6
| 580 Selene || 1905 SE ||  || December 17, 1905 || Heidelberg || M. F. Wolf || — || align=right | 48 km || 
|-id=581 bgcolor=#d6d6d6
| 581 Tauntonia || 1905 SH ||  || December 24, 1905 || Taunton || J. H. Metcalf || ALA || align=right | 61 km || 
|-id=582 bgcolor=#E9E9E9
| 582 Olympia || 1906 SO ||  || January 23, 1906 || Heidelberg || A. Kopff || — || align=right | 44 km || 
|-id=583 bgcolor=#d6d6d6
| 583 Klotilde || 1905 SP ||  || December 31, 1905 || Vienna || J. Palisa || — || align=right | 78 km || 
|-id=584 bgcolor=#fefefe
| 584 Semiramis || 1906 SY ||  || January 15, 1906 || Heidelberg || A. Kopff || — || align=right | 54 km || 
|-id=585 bgcolor=#fefefe
| 585 Bilkis || 1906 TA ||  || February 16, 1906 || Heidelberg || A. Kopff || — || align=right | 50 km || 
|-id=586 bgcolor=#d6d6d6
| 586 Thekla || 1906 TC ||  || February 21, 1906 || Heidelberg || M. F. Wolf || — || align=right | 95 km || 
|-id=587 bgcolor=#fefefe
| 587 Hypsipyle || 1906 TF ||  || February 22, 1906 || Heidelberg || M. F. Wolf || PHO || align=right | 11 km || 
|-id=588 bgcolor=#C2FFFF
| 588 Achilles || 1906 TG ||  || February 22, 1906 || Heidelberg || M. F. Wolf || L4 || align=right | 130 km || 
|-id=589 bgcolor=#d6d6d6
| 589 Croatia || 1906 TM ||  || March 3, 1906 || Heidelberg || A. Kopff || CRO || align=right | 94 km || 
|-id=590 bgcolor=#d6d6d6
| 590 Tomyris || 1906 TO ||  || March 4, 1906 || Heidelberg || M. F. Wolf || EOS || align=right | 31 km || 
|-id=591 bgcolor=#E9E9E9
| 591 Irmgard || 1906 TP ||  || March 14, 1906 || Heidelberg || A. Kopff || — || align=right | 52 km || 
|-id=592 bgcolor=#d6d6d6
| 592 Bathseba || 1906 TS ||  || March 18, 1906 || Heidelberg || M. F. Wolf || — || align=right | 44 km || 
|-id=593 bgcolor=#E9E9E9
| 593 Titania || 1906 TT ||  || March 20, 1906 || Heidelberg || A. Kopff || — || align=right | 70 km || 
|-id=594 bgcolor=#E9E9E9
| 594 Mireille || 1906 TW ||  || March 27, 1906 || Heidelberg || M. F. Wolf || — || align=right | 9.2 km || 
|-id=595 bgcolor=#d6d6d6
| 595 Polyxena || 1906 TZ ||  || March 27, 1906 || Heidelberg || A. Kopff || — || align=right | 91 km || 
|-id=596 bgcolor=#d6d6d6
| 596 Scheila || 1906 UA ||  || February 21, 1906 || Heidelberg || A. Kopff || — || align=right | 160 km || 
|-id=597 bgcolor=#E9E9E9
| 597 Bandusia || 1906 UB ||  || April 16, 1906 || Heidelberg || M. F. Wolf || — || align=right | 36 km || 
|-id=598 bgcolor=#E9E9E9
| 598 Octavia || 1906 UC ||  || April 13, 1906 || Heidelberg || M. F. Wolf || — || align=right | 78 km || 
|-id=599 bgcolor=#E9E9E9
| 599 Luisa || 1906 UJ ||  || April 25, 1906 || Taunton || J. H. Metcalf || POS || align=right | 70 km || 
|-id=600 bgcolor=#E9E9E9
| 600 Musa || 1906 UM ||  || June 14, 1906 || Taunton || J. H. Metcalf || — || align=right | 25 km || 
|}

601–700 

|-bgcolor=#d6d6d6
| 601 Nerthus || 1906 UN ||  || June 21, 1906 || Heidelberg || M. F. Wolf || URS || align=right | 76 km || 
|-id=602 bgcolor=#d6d6d6
| 602 Marianna || 1906 TE ||  || February 16, 1906 || Taunton || J. H. Metcalf || — || align=right | 110 km || 
|-id=603 bgcolor=#E9E9E9
| 603 Timandra || 1906 TJ ||  || February 16, 1906 || Taunton || J. H. Metcalf || — || align=right | 14 km || 
|-id=604 bgcolor=#d6d6d6
| 604 Tekmessa || 1906 TK ||  || February 16, 1906 || Taunton || J. H. Metcalf || — || align=right | 65 km || 
|-id=605 bgcolor=#d6d6d6
| 605 Juvisia || 1906 UU ||  || August 27, 1906 || Heidelberg || M. F. Wolf || — || align=right | 70 km || 
|-id=606 bgcolor=#E9E9E9
| 606 Brangäne || 1906 VB ||  || September 18, 1906 || Heidelberg || A. Kopff || BRG || align=right | 36 km || 
|-id=607 bgcolor=#d6d6d6
| 607 Jenny || 1906 VC ||  || September 18, 1906 || Heidelberg || A. Kopff || — || align=right | 68 km || 
|-id=608 bgcolor=#d6d6d6
| 608 Adolfine || 1906 VD ||  || September 18, 1906 || Heidelberg || A. Kopff || EOS || align=right | 20 km || 
|-id=609 bgcolor=#d6d6d6
| 609 Fulvia || 1906 VF ||  || September 24, 1906 || Heidelberg || M. F. Wolf || — || align=right | 54 km || 
|-id=610 bgcolor=#d6d6d6
| 610 Valeska || 1906 VK ||  || September 26, 1906 || Heidelberg || M. F. Wolf || — || align=right | 19 km || 
|-id=611 bgcolor=#d6d6d6
| 611 Valeria || 1906 VL ||  || September 24, 1906 || Taunton || J. H. Metcalf || — || align=right | 57 km || 
|-id=612 bgcolor=#d6d6d6
| 612 Veronika || 1906 VN ||  || October 8, 1906 || Heidelberg || A. Kopff || — || align=right | 39 km || 
|-id=613 bgcolor=#d6d6d6
| 613 Ginevra || 1906 VP ||  || October 11, 1906 || Heidelberg || A. Kopff || — || align=right | 81 km || 
|-id=614 bgcolor=#E9E9E9
| 614 Pia || 1906 VQ ||  || October 11, 1906 || Heidelberg || A. Kopff || — || align=right | 29 km || 
|-id=615 bgcolor=#E9E9E9
| 615 Roswitha || 1906 VR ||  || October 11, 1906 || Heidelberg || A. Kopff || — || align=right | 49 km || 
|-id=616 bgcolor=#E9E9E9
| 616 Elly || 1906 VT ||  || October 17, 1906 || Heidelberg || A. Kopff || MAR || align=right | 21 km || 
|-id=617 bgcolor=#C2FFFF
| 617 Patroclus || 1906 VY ||  || October 17, 1906 || Heidelberg || A. Kopff || L5moonslow || align=right | 140 km || 
|-id=618 bgcolor=#d6d6d6
| 618 Elfriede || 1906 VZ ||  || October 17, 1906 || Heidelberg || K. Lohnert || ELF || align=right | 131 km || 
|-id=619 bgcolor=#E9E9E9
| 619 Triberga || 1906 WC ||  || October 22, 1906 || Heidelberg || A. Kopff || — || align=right | 29 km || 
|-id=620 bgcolor=#fefefe
| 620 Drakonia || 1906 WE ||  || October 26, 1906 || Taunton || J. H. Metcalf || — || align=right | 11 km || 
|-id=621 bgcolor=#d6d6d6
| 621 Werdandi || 1906 WJ ||  || November 11, 1906 || Heidelberg || A. Kopff || THM || align=right | 30 km || 
|-id=622 bgcolor=#fefefe
| 622 Esther || 1906 WP ||  || November 13, 1906 || Taunton || J. H. Metcalf || — || align=right | 22 km || 
|-id=623 bgcolor=#fefefe
| 623 Chimaera || 1907 XJ ||  || January 22, 1907 || Heidelberg || K. Lohnert || CIM || align=right | 44 km || 
|-id=624 bgcolor=#C2FFFF
| 624 Hektor || 1907 XM ||  || February 10, 1907 || Heidelberg || A. Kopff || L4HEKmoon || align=right | 225 km || 
|-id=625 bgcolor=#E9E9E9
| 625 Xenia || 1907 XN ||  || February 11, 1907 || Heidelberg || A. Kopff || — || align=right | 28 km || 
|-id=626 bgcolor=#E9E9E9
| 626 Notburga || 1907 XO ||  || February 11, 1907 || Heidelberg || A. Kopff || — || align=right | 73 km || 
|-id=627 bgcolor=#d6d6d6
| 627 Charis || 1907 XS ||  || March 4, 1907 || Heidelberg || A. Kopff || CHA || align=right | 38 km || 
|-id=628 bgcolor=#E9E9E9
| 628 Christine || 1907 XT ||  || March 7, 1907 || Heidelberg || A. Kopff || — || align=right | 48 km || 
|-id=629 bgcolor=#d6d6d6
| 629 Bernardina || 1907 XU ||  || March 7, 1907 || Heidelberg || A. Kopff || — || align=right | 35 km || 
|-id=630 bgcolor=#E9E9E9
| 630 Euphemia || 1907 XW ||  || March 7, 1907 || Heidelberg || A. Kopff || EUNslow || align=right | 16 km || 
|-id=631 bgcolor=#E9E9E9
| 631 Philippina || 1907 YJ ||  || March 21, 1907 || Heidelberg || A. Kopff || — || align=right | 50 km || 
|-id=632 bgcolor=#E9E9E9
| 632 Pyrrha || 1907 YX ||  || April 5, 1907 || Heidelberg || A. Kopff || — || align=right | 14 km || 
|-id=633 bgcolor=#d6d6d6
| 633 Zelima || 1907 ZM ||  || May 12, 1907 || Heidelberg || A. Kopff || EOS || align=right | 33 km || 
|-id=634 bgcolor=#d6d6d6
| 634 Ute || 1907 ZN ||  || May 12, 1907 || Heidelberg || A. Kopff || — || align=right | 74 km || 
|-id=635 bgcolor=#d6d6d6
| 635 Vundtia || 1907 ZS ||  || June 9, 1907 || Heidelberg || K. Lohnert || — || align=right | 94 km || 
|-id=636 bgcolor=#d6d6d6
| 636 Erika || 1907 XP ||  || February 8, 1907 || Taunton || J. H. Metcalf || — || align=right | 73 km || 
|-id=637 bgcolor=#d6d6d6
| 637 Chrysothemis || 1907 YE ||  || March 11, 1907 || Taunton || J. H. Metcalf || THM || align=right | 24 km || 
|-id=638 bgcolor=#E9E9E9
| 638 Moira || 1907 ZQ ||  || May 5, 1907 || Taunton || J. H. Metcalf || — || align=right | 60 km || 
|-id=639 bgcolor=#d6d6d6
| 639 Latona || 1907 ZT ||  || July 19, 1907 || Heidelberg || K. Lohnert || EOS || align=right | 79 km || 
|-id=640 bgcolor=#d6d6d6
| 640 Brambilla || 1907 ZW ||  || August 29, 1907 || Heidelberg || A. Kopff || — || align=right | 63 km || 
|-id=641 bgcolor=#fefefe
| 641 Agnes || 1907 ZX ||  || September 8, 1907 || Heidelberg || M. F. Wolf || slow || align=right | 9.4 km || 
|-id=642 bgcolor=#d6d6d6
| 642 Clara || 1907 ZY ||  || September 8, 1907 || Heidelberg || M. F. Wolf || — || align=right | 33 km || 
|-id=643 bgcolor=#d6d6d6
| 643 Scheherezade || 1907 ZZ ||  || September 8, 1907 || Heidelberg || A. Kopff || 7:4 || align=right | 65 km || 
|-id=644 bgcolor=#E9E9E9
| 644 Cosima || 1907 AA ||  || September 7, 1907 || Heidelberg || A. Kopff || — || align=right | 17 km || 
|-id=645 bgcolor=#d6d6d6
| 645 Agrippina || 1907 AG ||  || September 13, 1907 || Taunton || J. H. Metcalf || — || align=right | 29 km || 
|-id=646 bgcolor=#fefefe
| 646 Kastalia || 1907 AC ||  || September 11, 1907 || Heidelberg || A. Kopff || — || align=right | 8.2 km || 
|-id=647 bgcolor=#fefefe
| 647 Adelgunde || 1907 AD ||  || September 11, 1907 || Heidelberg || A. Kopff || — || align=right | 9.7 km || 
|-id=648 bgcolor=#d6d6d6
| 648 Pippa || 1907 AE ||  || September 11, 1907 || Heidelberg || A. Kopff || — || align=right | 68 km || 
|-id=649 bgcolor=#E9E9E9
| 649 Josefa || 1907 AF ||  || September 11, 1907 || Heidelberg || A. Kopff || — || align=right | 7.7 km || 
|-id=650 bgcolor=#fefefe
| 650 Amalasuntha || 1907 AM ||  || October 4, 1907 || Heidelberg || A. Kopff || NYS || align=right | 19 km || 
|-id=651 bgcolor=#d6d6d6
| 651 Antikleia || 1907 AN ||  || October 4, 1907 || Heidelberg || A. Kopff || EOS || align=right | 32 km || 
|-id=652 bgcolor=#E9E9E9
| 652 Jubilatrix || 1907 AU ||  || November 4, 1907 || Vienna || J. Palisa || — || align=right | 16 km || 
|-id=653 bgcolor=#d6d6d6
| 653 Berenike || 1907 BK ||  || November 27, 1907 || Taunton || J. H. Metcalf || EOS || align=right | 50 km || 
|-id=654 bgcolor=#fefefe
| 654 Zelinda || 1908 BM ||  || January 4, 1908 || Heidelberg || A. Kopff || — || align=right | 161 km || 
|-id=655 bgcolor=#d6d6d6
| 655 Briseïs || 1907 BF ||  || November 4, 1907 || Taunton || J. H. Metcalf || slow || align=right | 29 km || 
|-id=656 bgcolor=#d6d6d6
| 656 Beagle || 1908 BU ||  || January 22, 1908 || Heidelberg || A. Kopff || THM || align=right | 63 km || 
|-id=657 bgcolor=#E9E9E9
| 657 Gunlöd || 1908 BV ||  || January 23, 1908 || Heidelberg || A. Kopff || — || align=right | 39 km || 
|-id=658 bgcolor=#d6d6d6
| 658 Asteria || 1908 BW ||  || January 23, 1908 || Heidelberg || A. Kopff || KOR || align=right | 22 km || 
|-id=659 bgcolor=#C2FFFF
| 659 Nestor || 1908 CS ||  || March 23, 1908 || Heidelberg || M. F. Wolf || L4 || align=right | 112 km || 
|-id=660 bgcolor=#E9E9E9
| 660 Crescentia || 1908 CC ||  || January 8, 1908 || Taunton || J. H. Metcalf || MAR || align=right | 42 km || 
|-id=661 bgcolor=#d6d6d6
| 661 Cloelia || 1908 CL ||  || February 22, 1908 || Taunton || J. H. Metcalf || EOS || align=right | 40 km || 
|-id=662 bgcolor=#E9E9E9
| 662 Newtonia || 1908 CW ||  || March 30, 1908 || Taunton || J. H. Metcalf || — || align=right | 22 km || 
|-id=663 bgcolor=#d6d6d6
| 663 Gerlinde || 1908 DG ||  || June 24, 1908 || Heidelberg || A. Kopff || — || align=right | 108 km || 
|-id=664 bgcolor=#d6d6d6
| 664 Judith || 1908 DH ||  || June 24, 1908 || Heidelberg || A. Kopff || — || align=right | 85 km || 
|-id=665 bgcolor=#d6d6d6
| 665 Sabine || 1908 DK ||  || July 22, 1908 || Heidelberg || W. Lorenz || — || align=right | 51 km || 
|-id=666 bgcolor=#E9E9E9
| 666 Desdemona || 1908 DM ||  || July 23, 1908 || Heidelberg || A. Kopff || — || align=right | 33 km || 
|-id=667 bgcolor=#d6d6d6
| 667 Denise || 1908 DN ||  || July 23, 1908 || Heidelberg || A. Kopff || — || align=right | 89 km || 
|-id=668 bgcolor=#E9E9E9
| 668 Dora || 1908 DO ||  || July 27, 1908 || Heidelberg || A. Kopff || DOR || align=right | 22 km || 
|-id=669 bgcolor=#d6d6d6
| 669 Kypria || 1908 DQ ||  || August 20, 1908 || Heidelberg || A. Kopff || EOS || align=right | 29 km || 
|-id=670 bgcolor=#E9E9E9
| 670 Ottegebe || 1908 DR ||  || August 20, 1908 || Heidelberg || A. Kopff || — || align=right | 36 km || 
|-id=671 bgcolor=#d6d6d6
| 671 Carnegia || 1908 DV ||  || September 21, 1908 || Vienna || J. Palisa || — || align=right | 61 km || 
|-id=672 bgcolor=#E9E9E9
| 672 Astarte || 1908 DY ||  || September 21, 1908 || Heidelberg || A. Kopff || — || align=right | 36 km || 
|-id=673 bgcolor=#E9E9E9
| 673 Edda || 1908 EA ||  || September 20, 1908 || Taunton || J. H. Metcalf || — || align=right | 38 km || 
|-id=674 bgcolor=#d6d6d6
| 674 Rachele || 1908 EP ||  || October 28, 1908 || Heidelberg || W. Lorenz || — || align=right | 96 km || 
|-id=675 bgcolor=#E9E9E9
| 675 Ludmilla || 1908 DU ||  || August 30, 1908 || Taunton || J. H. Metcalf || — || align=right | 76 km || 
|-id=676 bgcolor=#d6d6d6
| 676 Melitta || 1909 FN ||  || January 16, 1909 || Greenwich || P. Melotte || — || align=right | 78 km || 
|-id=677 bgcolor=#d6d6d6
| 677 Aaltje || 1909 FR ||  || January 18, 1909 || Heidelberg || A. Kopff || — || align=right | 32 km || 
|-id=678 bgcolor=#E9E9E9
| 678 Fredegundis || 1909 FS ||  || January 22, 1909 || Heidelberg || W. Lorenz || — || align=right | 40 km || 
|-id=679 bgcolor=#E9E9E9
| 679 Pax || 1909 FY ||  || January 28, 1909 || Heidelberg || A. Kopff || — || align=right | 64 km || 
|-id=680 bgcolor=#d6d6d6
| 680 Genoveva || 1909 GW ||  || April 22, 1909 || Heidelberg || A. Kopff || — || align=right | 84 km || 
|-id=681 bgcolor=#d6d6d6
| 681 Gorgo || 1909 GZ ||  || May 13, 1909 || Heidelberg || A. Kopff || — || align=right | 20 km || 
|-id=682 bgcolor=#E9E9E9
| 682 Hagar || 1909 HA ||  || June 17, 1909 || Heidelberg || A. Kopff || — || align=right | 14 km || 
|-id=683 bgcolor=#d6d6d6
| 683 Lanzia || 1909 HC ||  || July 23, 1909 || Heidelberg || M. F. Wolf || — || align=right | 83 km || 
|-id=684 bgcolor=#fefefe
| 684 Hildburg || 1909 HD ||  || August 8, 1909 || Heidelberg || A. Kopff || — || align=right | 19 km || 
|-id=685 bgcolor=#fefefe
| 685 Hermia || 1909 HE ||  || August 12, 1909 || Heidelberg || W. Lorenz || FLO || align=right | 11 km || 
|-id=686 bgcolor=#E9E9E9
| 686 Gersuind || 1909 HF ||  || August 15, 1909 || Heidelberg || A. Kopff || GER || align=right | 55 km || 
|-id=687 bgcolor=#E9E9E9
| 687 Tinette || 1909 HG ||  || August 16, 1909 || Vienna || J. Palisa || — || align=right | 22 km || 
|-id=688 bgcolor=#E9E9E9
| 688 Melanie || 1909 HH ||  || August 25, 1909 || Vienna || J. Palisa || — || align=right | 42 km || 
|-id=689 bgcolor=#fefefe
| 689 Zita || 1909 HJ ||  || September 12, 1909 || Vienna || J. Palisa || — || align=right | 16 km || 
|-id=690 bgcolor=#d6d6d6
| 690 Wratislavia || 1909 HZ ||  || October 16, 1909 || Taunton || J. H. Metcalf || — || align=right | 135 km || 
|-id=691 bgcolor=#d6d6d6
| 691 Lehigh || 1909 JG ||  || December 11, 1909 || Taunton || J. H. Metcalf || — || align=right | 79 km || 
|-id=692 bgcolor=#d6d6d6
| 692 Hippodamia || 1901 HD ||  || November 5, 1901 || Heidelberg || M. F. Wolf, A. Kopff || 7:4* || align=right | 43 km || 
|-id=693 bgcolor=#d6d6d6
| 693 Zerbinetta || 1909 HN ||  || September 21, 1909 || Heidelberg || A. Kopff || — || align=right | 82 km || 
|-id=694 bgcolor=#E9E9E9
| 694 Ekard || 1909 JA ||  || November 7, 1909 || Taunton || J. H. Metcalf || — || align=right | 122 km || 
|-id=695 bgcolor=#E9E9E9
| 695 Bella || 1909 JB ||  || November 7, 1909 || Taunton || J. H. Metcalf || MAR || align=right | 41 km || 
|-id=696 bgcolor=#d6d6d6
| 696 Leonora || 1910 JJ ||  || January 10, 1910 || Taunton || J. H. Metcalf || MEL || align=right | 82 km || 
|-id=697 bgcolor=#d6d6d6
| 697 Galilea || 1910 JO ||  || February 14, 1910 || Heidelberg || J. Helffrich || — || align=right | 80 km || 
|-id=698 bgcolor=#d6d6d6
| 698 Ernestina || 1910 JX ||  || March 5, 1910 || Heidelberg || J. Helffrich || — || align=right | 27 km || 
|-id=699 bgcolor=#FA8072
| 699 Hela || 1910 KD ||  || June 5, 1910 || Heidelberg || J. Helffrich || — || align=right | 21 km || 
|-id=700 bgcolor=#fefefe
| 700 Auravictrix || 1910 KE ||  || June 5, 1910 || Heidelberg || J. Helffrich || FLO || align=right | 16 km || 
|}

701–800 

|-bgcolor=#d6d6d6
| 701 Oriola || 1910 KN ||  || July 12, 1910 || Heidelberg || J. Helffrich || — || align=right | 43 km || 
|-id=702 bgcolor=#d6d6d6
| 702 Alauda || 1910 KQ ||  || July 16, 1910 || Heidelberg || J. Helffrich || ALAmoon || align=right | 191 km || 
|-id=703 bgcolor=#fefefe
| 703 Noëmi || 1910 KT ||  || October 3, 1910 || Vienna || J. Palisa || FLOslow || align=right | 7.3 km || 
|-id=704 bgcolor=#d6d6d6
| 704 Interamnia || 1910 KU ||  || October 2, 1910 || Teramo || V. Cerulli || — || align=right | 306 km || 
|-id=705 bgcolor=#d6d6d6
| 705 Erminia || 1910 KV ||  || October 6, 1910 || Heidelberg || E. Ernst || — || align=right | 132 km || 
|-id=706 bgcolor=#E9E9E9
| 706 Hirundo || 1910 KX ||  || October 9, 1910 || Heidelberg || J. Helffrich || — || align=right | 31 km || 
|-id=707 bgcolor=#fefefe
| 707 Steina || 1910 LD ||  || December 22, 1910 || Heidelberg || M. F. Wolf || slow || align=right | 9.0 km || 
|-id=708 bgcolor=#E9E9E9
| 708 Raphaela || 1911 LJ ||  || February 3, 1911 || Heidelberg || J. Helffrich || — || align=right | 21 km || 
|-id=709 bgcolor=#d6d6d6
| 709 Fringilla || 1911 LK ||  || February 3, 1911 || Heidelberg || J. Helffrich || FIR || align=right | 95 km || 
|-id=710 bgcolor=#d6d6d6
| 710 Gertrud || 1911 LM ||  || February 28, 1911 || Vienna || J. Palisa || THM || align=right | 29 km || 
|-id=711 bgcolor=#fefefe
| 711 Marmulla || 1911 LN ||  || March 1, 1911 || Vienna || J. Palisa || FLO || align=right | 9.0 km || 
|-id=712 bgcolor=#E9E9E9
| 712 Boliviana || 1911 LO ||  || March 19, 1911 || Heidelberg || M. F. Wolf || — || align=right | 124 km || 
|-id=713 bgcolor=#d6d6d6
| 713 Luscinia || 1911 LS ||  || April 18, 1911 || Heidelberg || J. Helffrich || 7:4 || align=right | 98 km || 
|-id=714 bgcolor=#E9E9E9
| 714 Ulula || 1911 LW ||  || May 18, 1911 || Heidelberg || J. Helffrich || MAR || align=right | 41 km || 
|-id=715 bgcolor=#E9E9E9
| 715 Transvaalia || 1911 LX ||  || April 22, 1911 || Johannesburg || H. E. Wood || — || align=right | 25 km || 
|-id=716 bgcolor=#E9E9E9
| 716 Berkeley || 1911 MD ||  || July 30, 1911 || Vienna || J. Palisa || — || align=right | 20 km || 
|-id=717 bgcolor=#d6d6d6
| 717 Wisibada || 1911 MJ ||  || August 26, 1911 || Heidelberg || F. Kaiser || — || align=right | 28 km || 
|-id=718 bgcolor=#d6d6d6
| 718 Erida || 1911 MS ||  || September 29, 1911 || Vienna || J. Palisa || — || align=right | 71 km || 
|-id=719 bgcolor=#FFC2E0
| 719 Albert || 1911 MT ||  || October 3, 1911 || Vienna || J. Palisa || AMO +1km || align=right | 2.8 km || 
|-id=720 bgcolor=#d6d6d6
| 720 Bohlinia || 1911 MW ||  || October 18, 1911 || Heidelberg || F. Kaiser || KOR || align=right | 34 km || 
|-id=721 bgcolor=#d6d6d6
| 721 Tabora || 1911 MZ ||  || October 18, 1911 || Heidelberg || F. Kaiser || 7:4 || align=right | 86 km || 
|-id=722 bgcolor=#fefefe
| 722 Frieda || 1911 NA ||  || October 18, 1911 || Vienna || J. Palisa || — || align=right | 8.3 km || 
|-id=723 bgcolor=#d6d6d6
| 723 Hammonia || 1911 NB ||  || October 21, 1911 || Vienna || J. Palisa || — || align=right | 23 km || 
|-id=724 bgcolor=#fefefe
| 724 Hapag || 1911 NC ||  || October 21, 1911 || Vienna || J. Palisa || — || align=right | 9.5 km || 
|-id=725 bgcolor=#E9E9E9
| 725 Amanda || 1911 ND ||  || October 21, 1911 || Vienna || J. Palisa || — || align=right | 24 km || 
|-id=726 bgcolor=#E9E9E9
| 726 Joëlla || 1911 NM ||  || November 22, 1911 || Winchester || J. H. Metcalf || — || align=right | 44 km || 
|-id=727 bgcolor=#E9E9E9
| 727 Nipponia || 1912 NT ||  || February 11, 1912 || Heidelberg || A. Massinger || MAR || align=right | 32 km || 
|-id=728 bgcolor=#fefefe
| 728 Leonisis || 1912 NU ||  || February 16, 1912 || Vienna || J. Palisa || FLO || align=right | 5.9 km || 
|-id=729 bgcolor=#E9E9E9
| 729 Watsonia || 1912 OD ||  || February 9, 1912 || Winchester || J. H. Metcalf || WAT || align=right | 50 km || 
|-id=730 bgcolor=#fefefe
| 730 Athanasia || 1912 OK ||  || April 10, 1912 || Vienna || J. Palisa || — || align=right | 4.5 km || 
|-id=731 bgcolor=#d6d6d6
| 731 Sorga || 1912 OQ ||  || April 15, 1912 || Heidelberg || A. Massinger || — || align=right | 35 km || 
|-id=732 bgcolor=#fefefe
| 732 Tjilaki || 1912 OR ||  || April 15, 1912 || Heidelberg || A. Massinger || — || align=right | 30 km || 
|-id=733 bgcolor=#d6d6d6
| 733 Mocia || 1912 PF ||  || September 16, 1912 || Heidelberg || M. F. Wolf || 7:4 || align=right | 98 km || 
|-id=734 bgcolor=#d6d6d6
| 734 Benda || 1912 PH ||  || October 11, 1912 || Vienna || J. Palisa || — || align=right | 67 km || 
|-id=735 bgcolor=#E9E9E9
| 735 Marghanna || 1912 PY ||  || December 9, 1912 || Heidelberg || H. Vogt || — || align=right | 68 km || 
|-id=736 bgcolor=#fefefe
| 736 Harvard || 1912 PZ ||  || November 16, 1912 || Winchester || J. H. Metcalf || — || align=right | 17 km || 
|-id=737 bgcolor=#E9E9E9
| 737 Arequipa || 1912 QB ||  || December 7, 1912 || Winchester || J. H. Metcalf || — || align=right | 48 km || 
|-id=738 bgcolor=#d6d6d6
| 738 Alagasta || 1913 QO ||  || January 7, 1913 || Heidelberg || F. Kaiser || — || align=right | 63 km || 
|-id=739 bgcolor=#E9E9E9
| 739 Mandeville || 1913 QR ||  || February 7, 1913 || Winchester || J. H. Metcalf || — || align=right | 105 km || 
|-id=740 bgcolor=#d6d6d6
| 740 Cantabia || 1913 QS ||  || February 10, 1913 || Winchester || J. H. Metcalf || — || align=right | 91 km || 
|-id=741 bgcolor=#E9E9E9
| 741 Botolphia || 1913 QT ||  || February 10, 1913 || Winchester || J. H. Metcalf || — || align=right | 30 km || 
|-id=742 bgcolor=#d6d6d6
| 742 Edisona || 1913 QU ||  || February 23, 1913 || Heidelberg || F. Kaiser || EOS || align=right | 47 km || 
|-id=743 bgcolor=#E9E9E9
| 743 Eugenisis || 1913 QV ||  || February 25, 1913 || Heidelberg || F. Kaiser || — || align=right | 51 km || 
|-id=744 bgcolor=#d6d6d6
| 744 Aguntina || 1913 QW ||  || February 26, 1913 || Vienna || J. Rheden || — || align=right | 59 km || 
|-id=745 bgcolor=#d6d6d6
| 745 Mauritia || 1913 QX ||  || March 1, 1913 || Heidelberg || F. Kaiser || — || align=right | 25 km || 
|-id=746 bgcolor=#d6d6d6
| 746 Marlu || 1913 QY ||  || March 1, 1913 || Heidelberg || F. Kaiser || — || align=right | 74 km || 
|-id=747 bgcolor=#d6d6d6
| 747 Winchester || 1913 QZ ||  || March 7, 1913 || Winchester || J. H. Metcalf || — || align=right | 172 km || 
|-id=748 bgcolor=#d6d6d6
| 748 Simeïsa || 1913 RD ||  || March 14, 1913 || Crimea-Simeis || G. N. Neujmin || 3:2 || align=right | 104 km || 
|-id=749 bgcolor=#fefefe
| 749 Malzovia || 1913 RF ||  || April 5, 1913 || Crimea-Simeis || S. Belyavskyj || — || align=right | 11 km || 
|-id=750 bgcolor=#fefefe
| 750 Oskar || 1913 RG ||  || April 28, 1913 || Vienna || J. Palisa || NYS || align=right | 23 km || 
|-id=751 bgcolor=#E9E9E9
| 751 Faïna || 1913 RK ||  || April 28, 1913 || Crimea-Simeis || G. N. Neujmin || — || align=right | 114 km || 
|-id=752 bgcolor=#fefefe
| 752 Sulamitis || 1913 RL ||  || April 30, 1913 || Crimea-Simeis || G. N. Neujmin || SUL || align=right | 60 km || 
|-id=753 bgcolor=#fefefe
| 753 Tiflis || 1913 RM ||  || April 30, 1913 || Crimea-Simeis || G. N. Neujmin || — || align=right | 21 km || 
|-id=754 bgcolor=#d6d6d6
| 754 Malabar || 1906 UT ||  || August 22, 1906 || Heidelberg || A. Kopff || — || align=right | 95 km || 
|-id=755 bgcolor=#d6d6d6
| 755 Quintilla || 1908 CZ ||  || April 6, 1908 || Taunton || J. H. Metcalf || — || align=right | 41 km || 
|-id=756 bgcolor=#d6d6d6
| 756 Lilliana || 1908 DC ||  || April 26, 1908 || Taunton || J. H. Metcalf || — || align=right | 65 km || 
|-id=757 bgcolor=#fefefe
| 757 Portlandia || 1908 EJ ||  || September 30, 1908 || Taunton || J. H. Metcalf || — || align=right | 33 km || 
|-id=758 bgcolor=#d6d6d6
| 758 Mancunia || 1912 PE ||  || May 18, 1912 || Johannesburg || H. E. Wood || — || align=right | 89 km || 
|-id=759 bgcolor=#E9E9E9
| 759 Vinifera || 1913 SJ ||  || August 26, 1913 || Heidelberg || F. Kaiser || — || align=right | 53 km || 
|-id=760 bgcolor=#d6d6d6
| 760 Massinga || 1913 SL ||  || August 28, 1913 || Heidelberg || F. Kaiser || — || align=right | 71 km || 
|-id=761 bgcolor=#d6d6d6
| 761 Brendelia || 1913 SO ||  || September 8, 1913 || Heidelberg || F. Kaiser || KOR || align=right | 21 km || 
|-id=762 bgcolor=#d6d6d6
| 762 Pulcova || 1913 SQ ||  || September 3, 1913 || Crimea-Simeis || G. N. Neujmin || moon || align=right | 147 km || 
|-id=763 bgcolor=#fefefe
| 763 Cupido || 1913 ST ||  || September 25, 1913 || Heidelberg || F. Kaiser || FLOslow || align=right | 7.0 km || 
|-id=764 bgcolor=#d6d6d6
| 764 Gedania || 1913 SU ||  || September 26, 1913 || Heidelberg || F. Kaiser || — || align=right | 58 km || 
|-id=765 bgcolor=#E9E9E9
| 765 Mattiaca || 1913 SV ||  || September 26, 1913 || Heidelberg || F. Kaiser || — || align=right | 8.0 km || 
|-id=766 bgcolor=#d6d6d6
| 766 Moguntia || 1913 SW ||  || September 29, 1913 || Heidelberg || F. Kaiser || EOS || align=right | 41 km || 
|-id=767 bgcolor=#d6d6d6
| 767 Bondia || 1913 SX ||  || September 23, 1913 || Winchester || J. H. Metcalf || THM || align=right | 43 km || 
|-id=768 bgcolor=#d6d6d6
| 768 Struveana || 1913 SZ ||  || October 4, 1913 || Crimea-Simeis || G. N. Neujmin || MEL || align=right | 33 km || 
|-id=769 bgcolor=#d6d6d6
| 769 Tatjana || 1913 TA ||  || October 6, 1913 || Crimea-Simeis || G. N. Neujmin || — || align=right | 97 km || 
|-id=770 bgcolor=#fefefe
| 770 Bali || 1913 TE ||  || October 31, 1913 || Heidelberg || A. Massinger || — || align=right | 16 km || 
|-id=771 bgcolor=#E9E9E9
| 771 Libera || 1913 TO ||  || November 21, 1913 || Vienna || J. Rheden || — || align=right | 29 km || 
|-id=772 bgcolor=#d6d6d6
| 772 Tanete || 1913 TR ||  || December 19, 1913 || Heidelberg || A. Massinger || — || align=right | 126 km || 
|-id=773 bgcolor=#d6d6d6
| 773 Irmintraud || 1913 TV ||  || December 22, 1913 || Heidelberg || F. Kaiser || — || align=right | 92 km || 
|-id=774 bgcolor=#d6d6d6
| 774 Armor || 1913 TW ||  || December 19, 1913 || Paris || C. le Morvan || — || align=right | 50 km || 
|-id=775 bgcolor=#d6d6d6
| 775 Lumière || 1914 TX ||  || January 6, 1914 || Nice || J. Lagrula || EOS || align=right | 32 km || 
|-id=776 bgcolor=#d6d6d6
| 776 Berbericia || 1914 TY ||  || January 24, 1914 || Heidelberg || A. Massinger || — || align=right | 152 km || 
|-id=777 bgcolor=#d6d6d6
| 777 Gutemberga || 1914 TZ ||  || January 24, 1914 || Heidelberg || F. Kaiser || — || align=right | 72 km || 
|-id=778 bgcolor=#d6d6d6
| 778 Theobalda || 1914 UA ||  || January 25, 1914 || Heidelberg || F. Kaiser || THB || align=right | 55 km || 
|-id=779 bgcolor=#E9E9E9
| 779 Nina || 1914 UB ||  || January 25, 1914 || Crimea-Simeis || G. N. Neujmin || — || align=right | 81 km || 
|-id=780 bgcolor=#d6d6d6
| 780 Armenia || 1914 UC ||  || January 25, 1914 || Crimea-Simeis || G. N. Neujmin || ARM || align=right | 126 km || 
|-id=781 bgcolor=#d6d6d6
| 781 Kartvelia || 1914 UF ||  || January 25, 1914 || Crimea-Simeis || G. N. Neujmin || — || align=right | 73 km || 
|-id=782 bgcolor=#fefefe
| 782 Montefiore || 1914 UK ||  || March 18, 1914 || Vienna || J. Palisa || — || align=right | 14 km || 
|-id=783 bgcolor=#fefefe
| 783 Nora || 1914 UL ||  || March 18, 1914 || Vienna || J. Palisa || — || align=right | 39 km || 
|-id=784 bgcolor=#d6d6d6
| 784 Pickeringia || 1914 UM ||  || March 20, 1914 || Winchester || J. H. Metcalf || — || align=right | 76 km || 
|-id=785 bgcolor=#E9E9E9
| 785 Zwetana || 1914 UN ||  || March 30, 1914 || Heidelberg || A. Massinger || — || align=right | 49 km || 
|-id=786 bgcolor=#d6d6d6
| 786 Bredichina || 1914 UO ||  || April 20, 1914 || Heidelberg || F. Kaiser || — || align=right | 108 km || 
|-id=787 bgcolor=#E9E9E9
| 787 Moskva || 1914 UQ ||  || April 20, 1914 || Crimea-Simeis || G. N. Neujmin || MAR || align=right | 28 km || 
|-id=788 bgcolor=#d6d6d6
| 788 Hohensteina || 1914 UR ||  || April 28, 1914 || Heidelberg || F. Kaiser || — || align=right | 111 km || 
|-id=789 bgcolor=#E9E9E9
| 789 Lena || 1914 UU ||  || June 24, 1914 || Crimea-Simeis || G. N. Neujmin || — || align=right | 22 km || 
|-id=790 bgcolor=#d6d6d6
| 790 Pretoria || 1912 NW ||  || January 16, 1912 || Johannesburg || H. E. Wood || 7:4 || align=right | 170 km || 
|-id=791 bgcolor=#d6d6d6
| 791 Ani || 1914 UV ||  || June 29, 1914 || Crimea-Simeis || G. N. Neujmin || MEL || align=right | 117 km || 
|-id=792 bgcolor=#E9E9E9
| 792 Metcalfia || 1907 ZC ||  || March 20, 1907 || Taunton || J. H. Metcalf || — || align=right | 62 km || 
|-id=793 bgcolor=#E9E9E9
| 793 Arizona || 1907 ZD ||  || April 9, 1907 || Flagstaff || P. Lowell || — || align=right | 27 km || 
|-id=794 bgcolor=#d6d6d6
| 794 Irenaea || 1914 VB ||  || August 27, 1914 || Vienna || J. Palisa || — || align=right | 36 km || 
|-id=795 bgcolor=#E9E9E9
| 795 Fini || 1914 VE ||  || September 26, 1914 || Vienna || J. Palisa || — || align=right | 85 km || 
|-id=796 bgcolor=#E9E9E9
| 796 Sarita || 1914 VH ||  || October 15, 1914 || Heidelberg || K. Reinmuth || — || align=right | 44 km || 
|-id=797 bgcolor=#E9E9E9
| 797 Montana || 1914 VR ||  || November 17, 1914 || Hamburg-Bergedorf || H. Thiele || — || align=right | 21 km || 
|-id=798 bgcolor=#d6d6d6
| 798 Ruth || 1914 VT ||  || November 21, 1914 || Heidelberg || M. F. Wolf || EOS || align=right | 43 km || 
|-id=799 bgcolor=#E9E9E9
| 799 Gudula || 1915 WO ||  || March 9, 1915 || Heidelberg || K. Reinmuth || — || align=right | 47 km || 
|-id=800 bgcolor=#fefefe
| 800 Kressmannia || 1915 WP ||  || March 20, 1915 || Heidelberg || M. F. Wolf || FLO || align=right | 15 km || 
|}

801–900 

|-bgcolor=#E9E9E9
| 801 Helwerthia || 1915 WQ ||  || March 20, 1915 || Heidelberg || M. F. Wolf || — || align=right | 32 km || 
|-id=802 bgcolor=#fefefe
| 802 Epyaxa || 1915 WR ||  || March 20, 1915 || Heidelberg || M. F. Wolf || FLO || align=right | 7.4 km || 
|-id=803 bgcolor=#d6d6d6
| 803 Picka || 1915 WS ||  || March 21, 1915 || Vienna || J. Palisa || — || align=right | 47 km || 
|-id=804 bgcolor=#d6d6d6
| 804 Hispania || 1915 WT ||  || March 20, 1915 || Barcelona || J. Comas i Solà || — || align=right | 138 km || 
|-id=805 bgcolor=#d6d6d6
| 805 Hormuthia || 1915 WW ||  || April 17, 1915 || Heidelberg || M. F. Wolf || — || align=right | 73 km || 
|-id=806 bgcolor=#d6d6d6
| 806 Gyldénia || 1915 WX ||  || April 18, 1915 || Heidelberg || M. F. Wolf || — || align=right | 83 km || 
|-id=807 bgcolor=#d6d6d6
| 807 Ceraskia || 1915 WY ||  || April 18, 1915 || Heidelberg || M. F. Wolf || EOS || align=right | 21 km || 
|-id=808 bgcolor=#E9E9E9
| 808 Merxia || 1901 GY ||  || October 11, 1901 || Heidelberg || L. Carnera || MRX || align=right | 31 km || 
|-id=809 bgcolor=#fefefe
| 809 Lundia || 1915 XP ||  || August 11, 1915 || Heidelberg || M. F. Wolf || FLOmoon || align=right | 9.5 km || 
|-id=810 bgcolor=#fefefe
| 810 Atossa || 1915 XQ ||  || September 8, 1915 || Heidelberg || M. F. Wolf || — || align=right | 8.1 km || 
|-id=811 bgcolor=#d6d6d6
| 811 Nauheima || 1915 XR ||  || September 8, 1915 || Heidelberg || M. F. Wolf || — || align=right | 16 km || 
|-id=812 bgcolor=#E9E9E9
| 812 Adele || 1915 XV ||  || September 8, 1915 || Crimea-Simeis || S. Belyavskyj || EUN || align=right | 12 km || 
|-id=813 bgcolor=#fefefe
| 813 Baumeia || 1915 YR ||  || November 28, 1915 || Heidelberg || M. F. Wolf || — || align=right | 12 km || 
|-id=814 bgcolor=#d6d6d6
| 814 Tauris || 1916 YT ||  || January 2, 1916 || Crimea-Simeis || G. N. Neujmin || — || align=right | 102 km || 
|-id=815 bgcolor=#E9E9E9
| 815 Coppelia || 1916 YU ||  || February 2, 1916 || Heidelberg || M. F. Wolf || — || align=right | 17 km || 
|-id=816 bgcolor=#d6d6d6
| 816 Juliana || 1916 YV ||  || February 8, 1916 || Heidelberg || M. F. Wolf || JLI || align=right | 51 km || 
|-id=817 bgcolor=#E9E9E9
| 817 Annika || 1916 YW ||  || February 6, 1916 || Heidelberg || M. F. Wolf || — || align=right | 23 km || 
|-id=818 bgcolor=#d6d6d6
| 818 Kapteynia || 1916 YZ ||  || February 21, 1916 || Heidelberg || M. F. Wolf || — || align=right | 64 km || 
|-id=819 bgcolor=#fefefe
| 819 Barnardiana || 1916 ZA ||  || March 3, 1916 || Heidelberg || M. F. Wolf || FLO || align=right | 8.9 km || 
|-id=820 bgcolor=#d6d6d6
| 820 Adriana || 1916 ZB ||  || March 30, 1916 || Heidelberg || M. F. Wolf || — || align=right | 59 km || 
|-id=821 bgcolor=#E9E9E9
| 821 Fanny || 1916 ZC ||  || March 31, 1916 || Heidelberg || M. F. Wolf || slow || align=right | 29 km || 
|-id=822 bgcolor=#fefefe
| 822 Lalage || 1916 ZD ||  || March 31, 1916 || Heidelberg || M. F. Wolf || — || align=right | 8.2 km || 
|-id=823 bgcolor=#fefefe
| 823 Sisigambis || 1916 ZG ||  || March 31, 1916 || Heidelberg || M. F. Wolf || FLOslow || align=right | 15 km || 
|-id=824 bgcolor=#E9E9E9
| 824 Anastasia || 1916 ZH ||  || March 25, 1916 || Crimea-Simeis || G. N. Neujmin || slow || align=right | 32 km || 
|-id=825 bgcolor=#fefefe
| 825 Tanina || 1916 ZL ||  || March 27, 1916 || Crimea-Simeis || G. N. Neujmin || — || align=right | 13 km || 
|-id=826 bgcolor=#E9E9E9
| 826 Henrika || 1916 ZO ||  || April 28, 1916 || Heidelberg || M. F. Wolf || — || align=right | 23 km || 
|-id=827 bgcolor=#fefefe
| 827 Wolfiana || 1916 ZW ||  || August 29, 1916 || Vienna || J. Palisa || FLO || align=right | 8.5 km || 
|-id=828 bgcolor=#d6d6d6
| 828 Lindemannia || 1916 ZX ||  || August 29, 1916 || Vienna || J. Palisa || — || align=right | 48 km || 
|-id=829 bgcolor=#E9E9E9
| 829 Academia || 1916 ZY ||  || August 25, 1916 || Crimea-Simeis || G. N. Neujmin || — || align=right | 43 km || 
|-id=830 bgcolor=#d6d6d6
| 830 Petropolitana || 1916 ZZ ||  || August 25, 1916 || Crimea-Simeis || G. N. Neujmin || — || align=right | 41 km || 
|-id=831 bgcolor=#fefefe
| 831 Stateira || 1916 AA ||  || September 20, 1916 || Heidelberg || M. F. Wolf || FLOslow || align=right | 7.2 km || 
|-id=832 bgcolor=#d6d6d6
| 832 Karin || 1916 AB ||  || September 20, 1916 || Heidelberg || M. F. Wolf || KAR || align=right | 16 km || 
|-id=833 bgcolor=#d6d6d6
| 833 Monica || 1916 AC ||  || September 20, 1916 || Heidelberg || M. F. Wolf || EOS || align=right | 22 km || 
|-id=834 bgcolor=#d6d6d6
| 834 Burnhamia || 1916 AD ||  || September 20, 1916 || Heidelberg || M. F. Wolf || — || align=right | 61 km || 
|-id=835 bgcolor=#d6d6d6
| 835 Olivia || 1916 AE ||  || September 23, 1916 || Heidelberg || M. F. Wolf || — || align=right | 30 km || 
|-id=836 bgcolor=#fefefe
| 836 Jole || 1916 AF ||  || September 23, 1916 || Heidelberg || M. F. Wolf || — || align=right | 5.8 km || 
|-id=837 bgcolor=#fefefe
| 837 Schwarzschilda || 1916 AG ||  || September 23, 1916 || Heidelberg || M. F. Wolf || — || align=right | 6.0 km || 
|-id=838 bgcolor=#d6d6d6
| 838 Seraphina || 1916 AH ||  || September 24, 1916 || Heidelberg || M. F. Wolf || — || align=right | 58 km || 
|-id=839 bgcolor=#E9E9E9
| 839 Valborg || 1916 AJ ||  || September 24, 1916 || Heidelberg || M. F. Wolf || — || align=right | 20 km || 
|-id=840 bgcolor=#d6d6d6
| 840 Zenobia || 1916 AK ||  || September 25, 1916 || Heidelberg || M. F. Wolf || — || align=right | 27 km || 
|-id=841 bgcolor=#fefefe
| 841 Arabella || 1916 AL ||  || October 1, 1916 || Heidelberg || M. F. Wolf || FLO || align=right | 7.5 km || 
|-id=842 bgcolor=#d6d6d6
| 842 Kerstin || 1916 AM ||  || October 1, 1916 || Heidelberg || M. F. Wolf || — || align=right | 44 km || 
|-id=843 bgcolor=#fefefe
| 843 Nicolaia || 1916 AN ||  || September 30, 1916 || Hamburg-Bergedorf || H. Thiele || — || align=right | 4.8 km || 
|-id=844 bgcolor=#d6d6d6
| 844 Leontina || 1916 AP ||  || October 1, 1916 || Vienna || J. Rheden || — || align=right | 42 km || 
|-id=845 bgcolor=#d6d6d6
| 845 Naëma || 1916 AS ||  || November 16, 1916 || Heidelberg || M. F. Wolf || NAE || align=right | 53 km || 
|-id=846 bgcolor=#d6d6d6
| 846 Lipperta || 1916 AT ||  || November 26, 1916 || Hamburg-Bergedorf || K. Gyllenberg || THMslow || align=right | 52 km || 
|-id=847 bgcolor=#E9E9E9
| 847 Agnia || 1915 XX ||  || September 2, 1915 || Crimea-Simeis || G. N. Neujmin || AGN || align=right | 25 km || 
|-id=848 bgcolor=#d6d6d6
| 848 Inna || 1915 XS ||  || September 5, 1915 || Crimea-Simeis || G. N. Neujmin || THM || align=right | 33 km || 
|-id=849 bgcolor=#d6d6d6
| 849 Ara || 1912 NY ||  || February 9, 1912 || Crimea-Simeis || S. Belyavskyj || — || align=right | 81 km || 
|-id=850 bgcolor=#d6d6d6
| 850 Altona ||  ||  || March 27, 1916 || Crimea-Simeis || S. Belyavskyj || — || align=right | 81 km || 
|-id=851 bgcolor=#fefefe
| 851 Zeissia ||  ||  || April 2, 1916 || Crimea-Simeis || S. Belyavskyj || — || align=right | 13 km || 
|-id=852 bgcolor=#fefefe
| 852 Wladilena ||  ||  || April 2, 1916 || Crimea-Simeis || S. Belyavskyj || PHO || align=right | 27 km || 
|-id=853 bgcolor=#fefefe
| 853 Nansenia ||  ||  || April 2, 1916 || Crimea-Simeis || S. Belyavskyj || — || align=right | 28 km || 
|-id=854 bgcolor=#fefefe
| 854 Frostia ||  ||  || April 3, 1916 || Crimea-Simeis || S. Belyavskyj || moon || align=right | 7.8 km || 
|-id=855 bgcolor=#fefefe
| 855 Newcombia || 1916 ZP ||  || April 3, 1916 || Crimea-Simeis || S. Belyavskyj || — || align=right | 12 km || 
|-id=856 bgcolor=#fefefe
| 856 Backlunda ||  ||  || April 3, 1916 || Crimea-Simeis || S. Belyavskyj || — || align=right | 45 km || 
|-id=857 bgcolor=#fefefe
| 857 Glasenappia ||  ||  || April 6, 1916 || Crimea-Simeis || S. Belyavskyj || — || align=right | 14 km || 
|-id=858 bgcolor=#E9E9E9
| 858 El Djezaïr || 1916 a ||  || May 26, 1916 || Algiers || F. Sy || — || align=right | 23 km || 
|-id=859 bgcolor=#d6d6d6
| 859 Bouzaréah || 1916 c ||  || October 2, 1916 || Algiers || F. Sy || — || align=right | 65 km || 
|-id=860 bgcolor=#E9E9E9
| 860 Ursina || 1917 BD ||  || January 22, 1917 || Heidelberg || M. F. Wolf || — || align=right | 35 km || 
|-id=861 bgcolor=#d6d6d6
| 861 Aïda || 1917 BE ||  || January 22, 1917 || Heidelberg || M. F. Wolf || — || align=right | 67 km || 
|-id=862 bgcolor=#E9E9E9
| 862 Franzia || 1917 BF ||  || January 28, 1917 || Heidelberg || M. F. Wolf || — || align=right | 27 km || 
|-id=863 bgcolor=#d6d6d6
| 863 Benkoela || 1917 BH ||  || February 9, 1917 || Heidelberg || M. F. Wolf || — || align=right | 39 km || 
|-id=864 bgcolor=#fefefe
| 864 Aase || A921 SB ||  || September 30, 1921 || Heidelberg || K. Reinmuth || FLO || align=right | 7.2 km || 
|-id=865 bgcolor=#fefefe
| 865 Zubaida || 1917 BO ||  || February 15, 1917 || Heidelberg || M. F. Wolf || — || align=right | 18 km || 
|-id=866 bgcolor=#d6d6d6
| 866 Fatme || 1917 BQ ||  || February 25, 1917 || Heidelberg || M. F. Wolf || — || align=right | 78 km || 
|-id=867 bgcolor=#d6d6d6
| 867 Kovacia || 1917 BS ||  || February 25, 1917 || Vienna || J. Palisa || HYG || align=right | 24 km || 
|-id=868 bgcolor=#E9E9E9
| 868 Lova || 1917 BU ||  || April 26, 1917 || Heidelberg || M. F. Wolf || — || align=right | 51 km || 
|-id=869 bgcolor=#E9E9E9
| 869 Mellena || 1917 BV ||  || May 9, 1917 || Hamburg-Bergedorf || R. Schorr || — || align=right | 21 km || 
|-id=870 bgcolor=#fefefe
| 870 Manto || 1917 BX ||  || May 12, 1917 || Heidelberg || M. F. Wolf || slow || align=right | 14 km || 
|-id=871 bgcolor=#fefefe
| 871 Amneris || 1917 BY ||  || May 14, 1917 || Heidelberg || M. F. Wolf || FLO || align=right | 8.0 km || 
|-id=872 bgcolor=#E9E9E9
| 872 Holda || 1917 BZ ||  || May 21, 1917 || Heidelberg || M. F. Wolf || — || align=right | 34 km || 
|-id=873 bgcolor=#E9E9E9
| 873 Mechthild || 1917 CA ||  || May 21, 1917 || Heidelberg || M. F. Wolf || — || align=right | 34 km || 
|-id=874 bgcolor=#d6d6d6
| 874 Rotraut || 1917 CC ||  || May 25, 1917 || Heidelberg || M. F. Wolf || — || align=right | 58 km || 
|-id=875 bgcolor=#E9E9E9
| 875 Nymphe || 1917 CF ||  || May 19, 1917 || Heidelberg || M. F. Wolf || MAR || align=right | 14 km || 
|-id=876 bgcolor=#d6d6d6
| 876 Scott || 1917 CH ||  || June 20, 1917 || Vienna || J. Palisa || EOS || align=right | 22 km || 
|-id=877 bgcolor=#fefefe
| 877 Walküre || 1915 S7 ||  || September 13, 1915 || Crimea-Simeis || G. N. Neujmin || — || align=right | 38 km || 
|-id=878 bgcolor=#fefefe
| 878 Mildred || 1916 f ||  || September 6, 1916 || Mount Wilson || S. B. Nicholson || NYS || align=right | 2.5 km || 
|-id=879 bgcolor=#E9E9E9
| 879 Ricarda || 1917 CJ ||  || July 22, 1917 || Heidelberg || M. F. Wolf || MAR || align=right | 18 km || 
|-id=880 bgcolor=#d6d6d6
| 880 Herba || 1917 CK ||  || July 22, 1917 || Heidelberg || M. F. Wolf || — || align=right | 32 km || 
|-id=881 bgcolor=#E9E9E9
| 881 Athene || 1917 CL ||  || July 22, 1917 || Heidelberg || M. F. Wolf || — || align=right | 12 km || 
|-id=882 bgcolor=#d6d6d6
| 882 Swetlana || 1917 CM ||  || August 15, 1917 || Crimea-Simeis || G. N. Neujmin || — || align=right | 42 km || 
|-id=883 bgcolor=#fefefe
| 883 Matterania || 1917 CP ||  || September 14, 1917 || Heidelberg || M. F. Wolf || FLO || align=right | 7.0 km || 
|-id=884 bgcolor=#C2FFFF
| 884 Priamus || 1917 CQ ||  || September 22, 1917 || Heidelberg || M. F. Wolf || L5 || align=right | 101 km || 
|-id=885 bgcolor=#d6d6d6
| 885 Ulrike || 1917 CX ||  || September 23, 1917 || Crimea-Simeis || S. Belyavskyj || — || align=right | 31 km || 
|-id=886 bgcolor=#d6d6d6
| 886 Washingtonia || 1917 b ||  || November 16, 1917 || Washington || G. H. Peters || — || align=right | 87 km || 
|-id=887 bgcolor=#FFC2E0
| 887 Alinda || 1918 DB ||  || January 3, 1918 || Heidelberg || M. F. Wolf || AMO +1km || align=right | 4.2 km || 
|-id=888 bgcolor=#E9E9E9
| 888 Parysatis || 1918 DC ||  || February 2, 1918 || Heidelberg || M. F. Wolf || — || align=right | 45 km || 
|-id=889 bgcolor=#fefefe
| 889 Erynia || 1918 DG ||  || March 5, 1918 || Heidelberg || M. F. Wolf || — || align=right | 17 km || 
|-id=890 bgcolor=#d6d6d6
| 890 Waltraut || 1918 DK ||  || March 11, 1918 || Heidelberg || M. F. Wolf || EOS || align=right | 28 km || 
|-id=891 bgcolor=#d6d6d6
| 891 Gunhild || 1918 DQ ||  || May 17, 1918 || Heidelberg || M. F. Wolf || — || align=right | 56 km || 
|-id=892 bgcolor=#d6d6d6
| 892 Seeligeria || 1918 DR ||  || May 31, 1918 || Heidelberg || M. F. Wolf || ALA || align=right | 74 km || 
|-id=893 bgcolor=#d6d6d6
| 893 Leopoldina || 1918 DS ||  || May 31, 1918 || Heidelberg || M. F. Wolf || — || align=right | 86 km || 
|-id=894 bgcolor=#d6d6d6
| 894 Erda || 1918 DT ||  || June 4, 1918 || Heidelberg || M. F. Wolf || — || align=right | 28 km || 
|-id=895 bgcolor=#d6d6d6
| 895 Helio || 1918 DU ||  || July 11, 1918 || Heidelberg || M. F. Wolf || EUP || align=right | 110 km || 
|-id=896 bgcolor=#fefefe
| 896 Sphinx || 1918 DV ||  || August 1, 1918 || Heidelberg || M. F. Wolf || — || align=right | 12 km || 
|-id=897 bgcolor=#E9E9E9
| 897 Lysistrata || 1918 DZ ||  || August 3, 1918 || Heidelberg || M. F. Wolf || MAR || align=right | 24 km || 
|-id=898 bgcolor=#E9E9E9
| 898 Hildegard || 1918 EA ||  || August 3, 1918 || Heidelberg || M. F. Wolf || — || align=right | 12 km || 
|-id=899 bgcolor=#d6d6d6
| 899 Jokaste || 1918 EB ||  || August 3, 1918 || Heidelberg || M. F. Wolf || — || align=right | 31 km || 
|-id=900 bgcolor=#fefefe
| 900 Rosalinde || 1918 EC ||  || August 10, 1918 || Heidelberg || M. F. Wolf || — || align=right | 20 km || 
|}

901–1000 

|-bgcolor=#fefefe
| 901 Brunsia || 1918 EE ||  || August 30, 1918 || Heidelberg || M. F. Wolf || — || align=right | 13 km || 
|-id=902 bgcolor=#fefefe
| 902 Probitas || 1918 EJ ||  || September 3, 1918 || Vienna || J. Palisa || — || align=right | 8.6 km || 
|-id=903 bgcolor=#d6d6d6
| 903 Nealley || 1918 EM ||  || September 13, 1918 || Vienna || J. Palisa || — || align=right | 58 km || 
|-id=904 bgcolor=#d6d6d6
| 904 Rockefellia || 1918 EO ||  || October 29, 1918 || Heidelberg || M. F. Wolf || — || align=right | 49 km || 
|-id=905 bgcolor=#fefefe
| 905 Universitas || 1918 ES ||  || October 30, 1918 || Hamburg-Bergedorf || A. Schwassmann || FLO || align=right | 12 km || 
|-id=906 bgcolor=#d6d6d6
| 906 Repsolda || 1918 ET ||  || October 30, 1918 || Hamburg-Bergedorf || A. Schwassmann || — || align=right | 66 km || 
|-id=907 bgcolor=#E9E9E9
| 907 Rhoda || 1918 EU ||  || November 12, 1918 || Heidelberg || M. F. Wolf || — || align=right | 83 km || 
|-id=908 bgcolor=#fefefe
| 908 Buda || 1918 EX ||  || November 30, 1918 || Heidelberg || M. F. Wolf || — || align=right | 31 km || 
|-id=909 bgcolor=#d6d6d6
| 909 Ulla || 1919 FA ||  || February 7, 1919 || Heidelberg || K. Reinmuth || ULA7:4 || align=right | 116 km || 
|-id=910 bgcolor=#d6d6d6
| 910 Anneliese || 1919 FB ||  || March 1, 1919 || Heidelberg || K. Reinmuth || — || align=right | 49 km || 
|-id=911 bgcolor=#C2FFFF
| 911 Agamemnon || 1919 FD ||  || March 19, 1919 || Heidelberg || K. Reinmuth || L4 || align=right | 131 km || 
|-id=912 bgcolor=#d6d6d6
| 912 Maritima || 1919 FJ ||  || April 27, 1919 || Hamburg-Bergedorf || A. Schwassmann || slow || align=right | 83 km || 
|-id=913 bgcolor=#fefefe
| 913 Otila || 1919 FL ||  || May 19, 1919 || Heidelberg || K. Reinmuth || FLO || align=right | 12 km || 
|-id=914 bgcolor=#fefefe
| 914 Palisana || 1919 FN ||  || July 4, 1919 || Heidelberg || M. F. Wolf || — || align=right | 76 km || 
|-id=915 bgcolor=#fefefe
| 915 Cosette || 1918 b ||  || December 14, 1918 || Algiers || F. Gonnessiat || FLO || align=right | 12 km || 
|-id=916 bgcolor=#fefefe
| 916 America || 1915 S1 ||  || August 7, 1915 || Crimea-Simeis || G. N. Neujmin || — || align=right | 33 km || 
|-id=917 bgcolor=#fefefe
| 917 Lyka || 1915 S4 ||  || September 5, 1915 || Crimea-Simeis || G. N. Neujmin || — || align=right | 35 km || 
|-id=918 bgcolor=#d6d6d6
| 918 Itha || 1919 FR ||  || August 22, 1919 || Heidelberg || K. Reinmuth || ITH || align=right | 22 km || 
|-id=919 bgcolor=#E9E9E9
| 919 Ilsebill || 1918 EQ ||  || October 30, 1918 || Heidelberg || M. F. Wolf || — || align=right | 34 km || 
|-id=920 bgcolor=#E9E9E9
| 920 Rogeria || 1919 FT ||  || September 1, 1919 || Heidelberg || K. Reinmuth || — || align=right | 27 km || 
|-id=921 bgcolor=#d6d6d6
| 921 Jovita || 1919 FV ||  || September 4, 1919 || Heidelberg || K. Reinmuth || — || align=right | 55 km || 
|-id=922 bgcolor=#E9E9E9
| 922 Schlutia || 1919 FW ||  || September 18, 1919 || Heidelberg || K. Reinmuth || — || align=right | 19 km || 
|-id=923 bgcolor=#E9E9E9
| 923 Herluga || 1919 GB ||  || September 30, 1919 || Heidelberg || K. Reinmuth || — || align=right | 35 km || 
|-id=924 bgcolor=#d6d6d6
| 924 Toni || 1919 GC ||  || October 20, 1919 || Heidelberg || K. Reinmuth || — || align=right | 85 km || 
|-id=925 bgcolor=#E9E9E9
| 925 Alphonsina || 1920 GM ||  || January 13, 1920 || Barcelona || J. Comas i Solà || HNS || align=right | 58 km || 
|-id=926 bgcolor=#d6d6d6
| 926 Imhilde || 1920 GN ||  || February 15, 1920 || Heidelberg || K. Reinmuth || IMH || align=right | 48 km || 
|-id=927 bgcolor=#d6d6d6
| 927 Ratisbona || 1920 GO ||  || February 16, 1920 || Heidelberg || M. F. Wolf || — || align=right | 76 km || 
|-id=928 bgcolor=#d6d6d6
| 928 Hildrun || 1920 GP ||  || February 23, 1920 || Heidelberg || K. Reinmuth || — || align=right | 63 km || 
|-id=929 bgcolor=#fefefe
| 929 Algunde || 1920 GR ||  || March 10, 1920 || Heidelberg || K. Reinmuth || FLO || align=right | 11 km || 
|-id=930 bgcolor=#fefefe
| 930 Westphalia || 1920 GS ||  || March 10, 1920 || Hamburg-Bergedorf || W. Baade || slow || align=right | 35 km || 
|-id=931 bgcolor=#d6d6d6
| 931 Whittemora || 1920 GU ||  || March 19, 1920 || Algiers || F. Gonnessiat || — || align=right | 45 km || 
|-id=932 bgcolor=#fefefe
| 932 Hooveria || 1920 GV ||  || March 23, 1920 || Vienna || J. Palisa || — || align=right | 59 km || 
|-id=933 bgcolor=#fefefe
| 933 Susi || 1927 CH ||  || February 10, 1927 || Heidelberg || K. Reinmuth || ERI || align=right | 22 km || 
|-id=934 bgcolor=#E9E9E9
| 934 Thüringia || 1920 HK ||  || August 15, 1920 || Hamburg-Bergedorf || W. Baade || — || align=right | 54 km || 
|-id=935 bgcolor=#fefefe
| 935 Clivia || 1920 HM ||  || September 7, 1920 || Heidelberg || K. Reinmuth || — || align=right | 6.4 km || 
|-id=936 bgcolor=#d6d6d6
| 936 Kunigunde || 1920 HN ||  || September 8, 1920 || Heidelberg || K. Reinmuth || THM || align=right | 43 km || 
|-id=937 bgcolor=#fefefe
| 937 Bethgea || 1920 HO ||  || September 12, 1920 || Heidelberg || K. Reinmuth || — || align=right | 11 km || 
|-id=938 bgcolor=#d6d6d6
| 938 Chlosinde || 1920 HQ ||  || September 9, 1920 || Heidelberg || K. Reinmuth || THM || align=right | 33 km || 
|-id=939 bgcolor=#fefefe
| 939 Isberga || 1920 HR ||  || October 4, 1920 || Heidelberg || K. Reinmuth || moon || align=right | 10 km || 
|-id=940 bgcolor=#d6d6d6
| 940 Kordula || 1920 HT ||  || October 10, 1920 || Heidelberg || K. Reinmuth || 7:4 || align=right | 80 km || 
|-id=941 bgcolor=#E9E9E9
| 941 Murray || 1920 HV ||  || October 10, 1920 || Vienna || J. Palisa || — || align=right | 18 km || 
|-id=942 bgcolor=#d6d6d6
| 942 Romilda || 1920 HW ||  || October 11, 1920 || Heidelberg || K. Reinmuth || — || align=right | 37 km || 
|-id=943 bgcolor=#d6d6d6
| 943 Begonia || 1920 HX ||  || October 20, 1920 || Heidelberg || K. Reinmuth || — || align=right | 71 km || 
|-id=944 bgcolor=#C7FF8F
| 944 Hidalgo || 1920 HZ ||  || October 31, 1920 || Hamburg-Bergedorf || W. Baade || unusual || align=right | 38 km || 
|-id=945 bgcolor=#E9E9E9
| 945 Barcelona || 1921 JB ||  || February 3, 1921 || Barcelona || J. Comas i Solà || BAR || align=right | 26 km || 
|-id=946 bgcolor=#d6d6d6
| 946 Poësia || 1921 JC ||  || February 11, 1921 || Heidelberg || M. F. Wolf || THMslow || align=right | 36 km || 
|-id=947 bgcolor=#E9E9E9
| 947 Monterosa || 1921 JD ||  || February 8, 1921 || Hamburg-Bergedorf || A. Schwassmann || — || align=right | 26 km || 
|-id=948 bgcolor=#d6d6d6
| 948 Jucunda || 1921 JE ||  || March 3, 1921 || Heidelberg || K. Reinmuth || — || align=right | 17 km || 
|-id=949 bgcolor=#d6d6d6
| 949 Hel || 1921 JK ||  || March 11, 1921 || Heidelberg || M. F. Wolf || — || align=right | 63 km || 
|-id=950 bgcolor=#fefefe
| 950 Ahrensa || 1921 JP ||  || April 1, 1921 || Heidelberg || K. Reinmuth || PHOslow || align=right | 14 km || 
|-id=951 bgcolor=#fefefe
| 951 Gaspra ||  ||  || July 30, 1916 || Crimea-Simeis || G. N. Neujmin || FLO || align=right | 12 km || 
|-id=952 bgcolor=#d6d6d6
| 952 Caia ||  ||  || October 27, 1916 || Crimea-Simeis || G. N. Neujmin || — || align=right | 89 km || 
|-id=953 bgcolor=#E9E9E9
| 953 Painleva || 1921 JT ||  || April 29, 1921 || Algiers || B. Jekhovsky || — || align=right | 24 km || 
|-id=954 bgcolor=#d6d6d6
| 954 Li || 1921 JU ||  || August 4, 1921 || Heidelberg || K. Reinmuth || THM || align=right | 59 km || 
|-id=955 bgcolor=#E9E9E9
| 955 Alstede || 1921 JV ||  || August 5, 1921 || Heidelberg || K. Reinmuth || — || align=right | 17 km || 
|-id=956 bgcolor=#fefefe
| 956 Elisa || 1921 JW ||  || August 8, 1921 || Heidelberg || K. Reinmuth || FLO || align=right | 10 km || 
|-id=957 bgcolor=#d6d6d6
| 957 Camelia || 1921 JX ||  || September 7, 1921 || Heidelberg || K. Reinmuth || slow? || align=right | 92 km || 
|-id=958 bgcolor=#d6d6d6
| 958 Asplinda || 1921 KC ||  || September 28, 1921 || Heidelberg || K. Reinmuth || 3:2 || align=right | 45 km || 
|-id=959 bgcolor=#d6d6d6
| 959 Arne || 1921 KF ||  || September 30, 1921 || Heidelberg || K. Reinmuth || slow || align=right | 45 km || 
|-id=960 bgcolor=#fefefe
| 960 Birgit || 1921 KH ||  || October 1, 1921 || Heidelberg || K. Reinmuth || — || align=right | 7.5 km || 
|-id=961 bgcolor=#E9E9E9
| 961 Gunnie || 1921 KM ||  || October 10, 1921 || Heidelberg || K. Reinmuth || — || align=right | 37 km || 
|-id=962 bgcolor=#d6d6d6
| 962 Aslög || 1921 KP ||  || October 25, 1921 || Heidelberg || K. Reinmuth || KOR || align=right | 18 km || 
|-id=963 bgcolor=#fefefe
| 963 Iduberga || 1921 KR ||  || October 26, 1921 || Heidelberg || K. Reinmuth || — || align=right | 9.0 km || 
|-id=964 bgcolor=#d6d6d6
| 964 Subamara || 1921 KS ||  || October 27, 1921 || Vienna || J. Palisa || — || align=right | 20 km || 
|-id=965 bgcolor=#d6d6d6
| 965 Angelica || 1921 KT ||  || November 4, 1921 || La Plata Observatory || J. Hartmann || — || align=right | 61 km || 
|-id=966 bgcolor=#E9E9E9
| 966 Muschi || 1921 KU ||  || November 9, 1921 || Hamburg-Bergedorf || W. Baade || — || align=right | 26 km || 
|-id=967 bgcolor=#fefefe
| 967 Helionape || 1921 KV ||  || November 9, 1921 || Hamburg-Bergedorf || W. Baade || FLO || align=right | 10 km || 
|-id=968 bgcolor=#d6d6d6
| 968 Petunia || 1921 KW ||  || November 24, 1921 || Heidelberg || K. Reinmuth || ITH || align=right | 24 km || 
|-id=969 bgcolor=#fefefe
| 969 Leocadia || 1921 KZ ||  || November 5, 1921 || Crimea-Simeis || S. Belyavskyj || — || align=right | 17 km || 
|-id=970 bgcolor=#E9E9E9
| 970 Primula || 1921 LB ||  || November 29, 1921 || Heidelberg || K. Reinmuth || — || align=right | 9.2 km || 
|-id=971 bgcolor=#E9E9E9
| 971 Alsatia || 1921 LF ||  || November 23, 1921 || Nice || A. Schaumasse || — || align=right | 61 km || 
|-id=972 bgcolor=#d6d6d6
| 972 Cohnia || 1922 LK ||  || January 18, 1922 || Heidelberg || M. F. Wolf || — || align=right | 78 km || 
|-id=973 bgcolor=#d6d6d6
| 973 Aralia || 1922 LR ||  || March 18, 1922 || Heidelberg || K. Reinmuth || URS || align=right | 52 km || 
|-id=974 bgcolor=#E9E9E9
| 974 Lioba || 1922 LS ||  || March 18, 1922 || Heidelberg || K. Reinmuth || — || align=right | 25 km || 
|-id=975 bgcolor=#d6d6d6
| 975 Perseverantia || 1922 LT ||  || March 27, 1922 || Vienna || J. Palisa || KOR || align=right | 22 km || 
|-id=976 bgcolor=#d6d6d6
| 976 Benjamina || 1922 LU ||  || March 27, 1922 || Algiers || B. Jekhovsky || — || align=right | 83 km || 
|-id=977 bgcolor=#d6d6d6
| 977 Philippa || 1922 LV ||  || April 6, 1922 || Algiers || B. Jekhovsky || — || align=right | 65 km || 
|-id=978 bgcolor=#d6d6d6
| 978 Aidamina || 1922 LY ||  || May 18, 1922 || Crimea-Simeis || S. Belyavskyj || — || align=right | 92 km || 
|-id=979 bgcolor=#d6d6d6
| 979 Ilsewa || 1922 MC ||  || June 29, 1922 || Heidelberg || K. Reinmuth || — || align=right | 36 km || 
|-id=980 bgcolor=#E9E9E9
| 980 Anacostia ||  ||  || November 21, 1921 || Washington || G. H. Peters || — || align=right | 75 km || 
|-id=981 bgcolor=#d6d6d6
| 981 Martina ||  ||  || September 23, 1917 || Crimea-Simeis || S. Belyavskyj || THM || align=right | 33 km || 
|-id=982 bgcolor=#d6d6d6
| 982 Franklina || 1922 MD ||  || May 21, 1922 || Johannesburg || H. E. Wood || — || align=right | 33 km || 
|-id=983 bgcolor=#d6d6d6
| 983 Gunila || 1922 ME ||  || July 30, 1922 || Heidelberg || K. Reinmuth || — || align=right | 74 km || 
|-id=984 bgcolor=#E9E9E9
| 984 Gretia || 1922 MH ||  || August 27, 1922 || Heidelberg || K. Reinmuth || — || align=right | 32 km || 
|-id=985 bgcolor=#FA8072
| 985 Rosina || 1922 MO ||  || October 14, 1922 || Heidelberg || K. Reinmuth || — || align=right | 7.9 km || 
|-id=986 bgcolor=#d6d6d6
| 986 Amelia || 1922 MQ ||  || October 19, 1922 || Barcelona || J. Comas i Solà || — || align=right | 49 km || 
|-id=987 bgcolor=#d6d6d6
| 987 Wallia || 1922 MR ||  || October 23, 1922 || Heidelberg || K. Reinmuth || — || align=right | 53 km || 
|-id=988 bgcolor=#d6d6d6
| 988 Appella || 1922 MT ||  || November 10, 1922 || Algiers || B. Jekhovsky || slow || align=right | 20 km || 
|-id=989 bgcolor=#E9E9E9
| 989 Schwassmannia || 1922 MW ||  || November 18, 1922 || Hamburg-Bergedorf || A. Schwassmann || slow || align=right | 13 km || 
|-id=990 bgcolor=#E9E9E9
| 990 Yerkes || 1922 MZ ||  || November 23, 1922 || Williams Bay || G. Van Biesbroeck || — || align=right | 21 km || 
|-id=991 bgcolor=#d6d6d6
| 991 McDonalda || 1922 NB ||  || October 24, 1922 || Williams Bay || O. Struve || THM || align=right | 39 km || 
|-id=992 bgcolor=#d6d6d6
| 992 Swasey || 1922 ND ||  || November 14, 1922 || Williams Bay || O. Struve || — || align=right | 28 km || 
|-id=993 bgcolor=#d6d6d6
| 993 Moultona || 1923 NJ ||  || January 12, 1923 || Williams Bay || G. Van Biesbroeck || KOR || align=right | 12 km || 
|-id=994 bgcolor=#E9E9E9
| 994 Otthild || 1923 NL ||  || March 18, 1923 || Heidelberg || K. Reinmuth || — || align=right | 21 km || 
|-id=995 bgcolor=#E9E9E9
| 995 Sternberga || 1923 NP ||  || June 8, 1923 || Crimea-Simeis || S. Belyavskyj || — || align=right | 20 km || 
|-id=996 bgcolor=#d6d6d6
| 996 Hilaritas || 1923 NM ||  || March 21, 1923 || Vienna || J. Palisa || THM || align=right | 29 km || 
|-id=997 bgcolor=#E9E9E9
| 997 Priska || 1923 NR ||  || July 12, 1923 || Heidelberg || K. Reinmuth || ADE || align=right | 20 km || 
|-id=998 bgcolor=#d6d6d6
| 998 Bodea || 1923 NU ||  || August 6, 1923 || Heidelberg || K. Reinmuth || — || align=right | 32 km || 
|-id=999 bgcolor=#E9E9E9
| 999 Zachia || 1923 NW ||  || August 9, 1923 || Heidelberg || K. Reinmuth || — || align=right | 17 km || 
|-id=000 bgcolor=#d6d6d6
| 1000 Piazzia || 1923 NZ ||  || August 12, 1923 || Heidelberg || K. Reinmuth || — || align=right | 48 km || 
|}

References

External links 
 Discovery Circumstances: Numbered Minor Planets (1)–(5000) (IAU Minor Planet Center)

0000